

278001–278100 

|-bgcolor=#E9E9E9
| 278001 ||  || — || October 18, 2006 || Kitt Peak || Spacewatch || MIS || align=right | 2.9 km || 
|-id=002 bgcolor=#E9E9E9
| 278002 ||  || — || October 18, 2006 || Kitt Peak || Spacewatch || — || align=right | 2.1 km || 
|-id=003 bgcolor=#d6d6d6
| 278003 ||  || — || October 19, 2006 || Kitt Peak || Spacewatch || — || align=right | 4.0 km || 
|-id=004 bgcolor=#fefefe
| 278004 ||  || — || October 19, 2006 || Kitt Peak || Spacewatch || — || align=right data-sort-value="0.59" | 590 m || 
|-id=005 bgcolor=#fefefe
| 278005 ||  || — || October 19, 2006 || Kitt Peak || Spacewatch || — || align=right data-sort-value="0.56" | 560 m || 
|-id=006 bgcolor=#fefefe
| 278006 ||  || — || October 21, 2006 || Mount Lemmon || Mount Lemmon Survey || fast? || align=right data-sort-value="0.96" | 960 m || 
|-id=007 bgcolor=#E9E9E9
| 278007 ||  || — || October 19, 2006 || Catalina || CSS || — || align=right | 1.8 km || 
|-id=008 bgcolor=#fefefe
| 278008 ||  || — || October 19, 2006 || Catalina || CSS || — || align=right data-sort-value="0.86" | 860 m || 
|-id=009 bgcolor=#fefefe
| 278009 ||  || — || October 20, 2006 || Kitt Peak || Spacewatch || FLO || align=right data-sort-value="0.58" | 580 m || 
|-id=010 bgcolor=#E9E9E9
| 278010 ||  || — || October 22, 2006 || Palomar || NEAT || — || align=right | 1.6 km || 
|-id=011 bgcolor=#E9E9E9
| 278011 ||  || — || October 22, 2006 || Palomar || NEAT || — || align=right | 1.8 km || 
|-id=012 bgcolor=#d6d6d6
| 278012 ||  || — || October 23, 2006 || Mount Lemmon || Mount Lemmon Survey || EOS || align=right | 2.3 km || 
|-id=013 bgcolor=#fefefe
| 278013 ||  || — || October 16, 2006 || Catalina || CSS || FLO || align=right data-sort-value="0.67" | 670 m || 
|-id=014 bgcolor=#E9E9E9
| 278014 ||  || — || October 23, 2006 || Kitt Peak || Spacewatch || ADE || align=right | 2.0 km || 
|-id=015 bgcolor=#fefefe
| 278015 ||  || — || October 28, 2006 || Mount Lemmon || Mount Lemmon Survey || — || align=right data-sort-value="0.62" | 620 m || 
|-id=016 bgcolor=#fefefe
| 278016 ||  || — || November 1, 2006 || Mount Lemmon || Mount Lemmon Survey || — || align=right data-sort-value="0.71" | 710 m || 
|-id=017 bgcolor=#fefefe
| 278017 ||  || — || November 9, 2006 || Kitt Peak || Spacewatch || — || align=right data-sort-value="0.96" | 960 m || 
|-id=018 bgcolor=#E9E9E9
| 278018 ||  || — || November 10, 2006 || Kitt Peak || Spacewatch || — || align=right | 1.9 km || 
|-id=019 bgcolor=#fefefe
| 278019 ||  || — || November 10, 2006 || Kitt Peak || Spacewatch || — || align=right data-sort-value="0.72" | 720 m || 
|-id=020 bgcolor=#fefefe
| 278020 ||  || — || November 11, 2006 || Catalina || CSS || FLO || align=right data-sort-value="0.70" | 700 m || 
|-id=021 bgcolor=#fefefe
| 278021 ||  || — || November 13, 2006 || Catalina || CSS || NYS || align=right data-sort-value="0.86" | 860 m || 
|-id=022 bgcolor=#fefefe
| 278022 ||  || — || November 10, 2006 || Kitt Peak || Spacewatch || NYS || align=right data-sort-value="0.75" | 750 m || 
|-id=023 bgcolor=#E9E9E9
| 278023 ||  || — || November 11, 2006 || Kitt Peak || Spacewatch || WIT || align=right | 1.3 km || 
|-id=024 bgcolor=#fefefe
| 278024 ||  || — || November 11, 2006 || Kitt Peak || Spacewatch || FLO || align=right data-sort-value="0.57" | 570 m || 
|-id=025 bgcolor=#fefefe
| 278025 ||  || — || November 1, 2006 || Catalina || CSS || FLO || align=right data-sort-value="0.77" | 770 m || 
|-id=026 bgcolor=#E9E9E9
| 278026 ||  || — || November 10, 2006 || Kitt Peak || Spacewatch || — || align=right | 2.9 km || 
|-id=027 bgcolor=#fefefe
| 278027 ||  || — || November 13, 2006 || Kitt Peak || Spacewatch || NYS || align=right data-sort-value="0.92" | 920 m || 
|-id=028 bgcolor=#E9E9E9
| 278028 ||  || — || November 15, 2006 || Kitt Peak || Spacewatch || EUN || align=right | 2.1 km || 
|-id=029 bgcolor=#fefefe
| 278029 ||  || — || November 15, 2006 || Catalina || CSS || V || align=right data-sort-value="0.96" | 960 m || 
|-id=030 bgcolor=#fefefe
| 278030 ||  || — || November 19, 2006 || Socorro || LINEAR || FLO || align=right data-sort-value="0.79" | 790 m || 
|-id=031 bgcolor=#fefefe
| 278031 ||  || — || November 16, 2006 || Lulin Observatory || M.-T. Chang, Q.-z. Ye || — || align=right data-sort-value="0.85" | 850 m || 
|-id=032 bgcolor=#E9E9E9
| 278032 ||  || — || November 17, 2006 || Mount Lemmon || Mount Lemmon Survey || EUN || align=right | 1.4 km || 
|-id=033 bgcolor=#E9E9E9
| 278033 ||  || — || November 18, 2006 || Socorro || LINEAR || HEN || align=right | 1.5 km || 
|-id=034 bgcolor=#fefefe
| 278034 ||  || — || November 16, 2006 || Kitt Peak || Spacewatch || NYS || align=right data-sort-value="0.58" | 580 m || 
|-id=035 bgcolor=#fefefe
| 278035 ||  || — || November 16, 2006 || Kitt Peak || Spacewatch || FLO || align=right data-sort-value="0.57" | 570 m || 
|-id=036 bgcolor=#fefefe
| 278036 ||  || — || November 16, 2006 || Kitt Peak || Spacewatch || — || align=right | 1.0 km || 
|-id=037 bgcolor=#fefefe
| 278037 ||  || — || November 16, 2006 || Mount Lemmon || Mount Lemmon Survey || NYS || align=right data-sort-value="0.84" | 840 m || 
|-id=038 bgcolor=#E9E9E9
| 278038 ||  || — || November 17, 2006 || Mount Lemmon || Mount Lemmon Survey || GAL || align=right | 2.2 km || 
|-id=039 bgcolor=#fefefe
| 278039 ||  || — || November 17, 2006 || Mount Lemmon || Mount Lemmon Survey || FLO || align=right data-sort-value="0.90" | 900 m || 
|-id=040 bgcolor=#fefefe
| 278040 ||  || — || November 18, 2006 || Kitt Peak || Spacewatch || — || align=right data-sort-value="0.82" | 820 m || 
|-id=041 bgcolor=#fefefe
| 278041 ||  || — || November 18, 2006 || Kitt Peak || Spacewatch || — || align=right data-sort-value="0.69" | 690 m || 
|-id=042 bgcolor=#fefefe
| 278042 ||  || — || November 18, 2006 || Socorro || LINEAR || FLO || align=right data-sort-value="0.80" | 800 m || 
|-id=043 bgcolor=#E9E9E9
| 278043 ||  || — || November 18, 2006 || Mount Lemmon || Mount Lemmon Survey || — || align=right | 1.7 km || 
|-id=044 bgcolor=#d6d6d6
| 278044 ||  || — || November 20, 2006 || Socorro || LINEAR || HIL || align=right | 7.9 km || 
|-id=045 bgcolor=#E9E9E9
| 278045 ||  || — || November 20, 2006 || Kitt Peak || Spacewatch || — || align=right | 3.1 km || 
|-id=046 bgcolor=#fefefe
| 278046 ||  || — || November 22, 2006 || Catalina || CSS || FLO || align=right data-sort-value="0.62" | 620 m || 
|-id=047 bgcolor=#E9E9E9
| 278047 ||  || — || November 23, 2006 || Kitt Peak || Spacewatch || ADE || align=right | 3.0 km || 
|-id=048 bgcolor=#E9E9E9
| 278048 ||  || — || November 23, 2006 || Kitt Peak || Spacewatch || WIT || align=right | 1.6 km || 
|-id=049 bgcolor=#fefefe
| 278049 ||  || — || November 24, 2006 || Kitt Peak || Spacewatch || — || align=right data-sort-value="0.62" | 620 m || 
|-id=050 bgcolor=#fefefe
| 278050 ||  || — || November 24, 2006 || Kitt Peak || Spacewatch || — || align=right data-sort-value="0.87" | 870 m || 
|-id=051 bgcolor=#fefefe
| 278051 ||  || — || November 24, 2006 || Kitt Peak || Spacewatch || — || align=right data-sort-value="0.83" | 830 m || 
|-id=052 bgcolor=#fefefe
| 278052 ||  || — || November 25, 2006 || Catalina || CSS || — || align=right data-sort-value="0.79" | 790 m || 
|-id=053 bgcolor=#d6d6d6
| 278053 ||  || — || November 16, 2006 || Mount Lemmon || Mount Lemmon Survey || EOS || align=right | 2.4 km || 
|-id=054 bgcolor=#fefefe
| 278054 ||  || — || December 10, 2006 || Kitt Peak || Spacewatch || — || align=right data-sort-value="0.92" | 920 m || 
|-id=055 bgcolor=#fefefe
| 278055 ||  || — || December 11, 2006 || Kitt Peak || Spacewatch || — || align=right | 1.2 km || 
|-id=056 bgcolor=#fefefe
| 278056 ||  || — || December 12, 2006 || Catalina || CSS || — || align=right data-sort-value="0.78" | 780 m || 
|-id=057 bgcolor=#E9E9E9
| 278057 ||  || — || December 13, 2006 || Socorro || LINEAR || — || align=right | 2.6 km || 
|-id=058 bgcolor=#fefefe
| 278058 ||  || — || December 14, 2006 || Kitt Peak || Spacewatch || FLO || align=right data-sort-value="0.71" | 710 m || 
|-id=059 bgcolor=#E9E9E9
| 278059 ||  || — || December 14, 2006 || Palomar || NEAT || — || align=right | 3.2 km || 
|-id=060 bgcolor=#fefefe
| 278060 ||  || — || December 15, 2006 || Mount Lemmon || Mount Lemmon Survey || FLO || align=right data-sort-value="0.93" | 930 m || 
|-id=061 bgcolor=#fefefe
| 278061 ||  || — || December 21, 2006 || Kitt Peak || Spacewatch || — || align=right data-sort-value="0.95" | 950 m || 
|-id=062 bgcolor=#fefefe
| 278062 ||  || — || December 21, 2006 || Mount Lemmon || Mount Lemmon Survey || FLO || align=right | 1.3 km || 
|-id=063 bgcolor=#E9E9E9
| 278063 ||  || — || December 23, 2006 || Mount Lemmon || Mount Lemmon Survey || — || align=right | 1.7 km || 
|-id=064 bgcolor=#fefefe
| 278064 ||  || — || December 21, 2006 || Kitt Peak || Spacewatch || — || align=right | 1.0 km || 
|-id=065 bgcolor=#fefefe
| 278065 ||  || — || December 21, 2006 || Kitt Peak || Spacewatch || — || align=right data-sort-value="0.70" | 700 m || 
|-id=066 bgcolor=#fefefe
| 278066 ||  || — || December 21, 2006 || Kitt Peak || Spacewatch || — || align=right | 2.4 km || 
|-id=067 bgcolor=#fefefe
| 278067 ||  || — || December 22, 2006 || Kitt Peak || Spacewatch || — || align=right data-sort-value="0.82" | 820 m || 
|-id=068 bgcolor=#fefefe
| 278068 ||  || — || December 27, 2006 || Mount Lemmon || Mount Lemmon Survey || NYS || align=right data-sort-value="0.74" | 740 m || 
|-id=069 bgcolor=#fefefe
| 278069 ||  || — || December 24, 2006 || Kitt Peak || Spacewatch || MAS || align=right data-sort-value="0.80" | 800 m || 
|-id=070 bgcolor=#fefefe
| 278070 ||  || — || January 8, 2007 || Catalina || CSS || NYS || align=right data-sort-value="0.79" | 790 m || 
|-id=071 bgcolor=#E9E9E9
| 278071 ||  || — || January 8, 2007 || Catalina || CSS || — || align=right | 1.5 km || 
|-id=072 bgcolor=#fefefe
| 278072 ||  || — || January 9, 2007 || Mount Lemmon || Mount Lemmon Survey || — || align=right | 1.4 km || 
|-id=073 bgcolor=#fefefe
| 278073 ||  || — || January 9, 2007 || Palomar || NEAT || NYS || align=right data-sort-value="0.65" | 650 m || 
|-id=074 bgcolor=#fefefe
| 278074 ||  || — || January 9, 2007 || Mount Lemmon || Mount Lemmon Survey || — || align=right | 1.7 km || 
|-id=075 bgcolor=#fefefe
| 278075 ||  || — || January 8, 2007 || Catalina || CSS || — || align=right data-sort-value="0.79" | 790 m || 
|-id=076 bgcolor=#d6d6d6
| 278076 ||  || — || January 15, 2007 || Kitt Peak || Spacewatch || EOS || align=right | 4.0 km || 
|-id=077 bgcolor=#fefefe
| 278077 ||  || — || January 10, 2007 || Mount Lemmon || Mount Lemmon Survey || NYS || align=right | 1.7 km || 
|-id=078 bgcolor=#fefefe
| 278078 ||  || — || January 15, 2007 || Catalina || CSS || — || align=right | 1.2 km || 
|-id=079 bgcolor=#E9E9E9
| 278079 ||  || — || January 10, 2007 || Mount Lemmon || Mount Lemmon Survey || — || align=right | 1.2 km || 
|-id=080 bgcolor=#d6d6d6
| 278080 ||  || — || January 10, 2007 || Kitt Peak || Spacewatch || — || align=right | 3.5 km || 
|-id=081 bgcolor=#fefefe
| 278081 ||  || — || January 16, 2007 || Socorro || LINEAR || — || align=right data-sort-value="0.86" | 860 m || 
|-id=082 bgcolor=#fefefe
| 278082 ||  || — || January 16, 2007 || Socorro || LINEAR || — || align=right | 1.2 km || 
|-id=083 bgcolor=#fefefe
| 278083 ||  || — || January 17, 2007 || Catalina || CSS || — || align=right data-sort-value="0.85" | 850 m || 
|-id=084 bgcolor=#fefefe
| 278084 ||  || — || January 17, 2007 || Palomar || NEAT || — || align=right | 1.0 km || 
|-id=085 bgcolor=#fefefe
| 278085 ||  || — || January 17, 2007 || Kitt Peak || Spacewatch || — || align=right | 1.0 km || 
|-id=086 bgcolor=#fefefe
| 278086 ||  || — || January 17, 2007 || Kitt Peak || Spacewatch || FLO || align=right data-sort-value="0.65" | 650 m || 
|-id=087 bgcolor=#fefefe
| 278087 ||  || — || January 17, 2007 || Kitt Peak || Spacewatch || FLO || align=right data-sort-value="0.70" | 700 m || 
|-id=088 bgcolor=#fefefe
| 278088 ||  || — || January 17, 2007 || Kitt Peak || Spacewatch || FLO || align=right data-sort-value="0.71" | 710 m || 
|-id=089 bgcolor=#fefefe
| 278089 ||  || — || April 16, 2004 || Kitt Peak || Spacewatch || — || align=right data-sort-value="0.68" | 680 m || 
|-id=090 bgcolor=#E9E9E9
| 278090 ||  || — || January 21, 2007 || Socorro || LINEAR || — || align=right | 1.2 km || 
|-id=091 bgcolor=#E9E9E9
| 278091 ||  || — || January 23, 2007 || Socorro || LINEAR || — || align=right | 1.1 km || 
|-id=092 bgcolor=#fefefe
| 278092 ||  || — || January 23, 2007 || Anderson Mesa || LONEOS || — || align=right data-sort-value="0.88" | 880 m || 
|-id=093 bgcolor=#E9E9E9
| 278093 ||  || — || January 23, 2007 || Anderson Mesa || LONEOS || — || align=right | 2.1 km || 
|-id=094 bgcolor=#fefefe
| 278094 ||  || — || January 24, 2007 || Mount Lemmon || Mount Lemmon Survey || EUT || align=right data-sort-value="0.70" | 700 m || 
|-id=095 bgcolor=#fefefe
| 278095 ||  || — || January 24, 2007 || Mount Lemmon || Mount Lemmon Survey || — || align=right data-sort-value="0.78" | 780 m || 
|-id=096 bgcolor=#fefefe
| 278096 ||  || — || January 24, 2007 || Socorro || LINEAR || — || align=right | 1.1 km || 
|-id=097 bgcolor=#fefefe
| 278097 ||  || — || January 24, 2007 || Socorro || LINEAR || — || align=right | 1.1 km || 
|-id=098 bgcolor=#fefefe
| 278098 ||  || — || January 26, 2007 || Calvin-Rehoboth || L. A. Molnar || — || align=right data-sort-value="0.84" | 840 m || 
|-id=099 bgcolor=#fefefe
| 278099 ||  || — || January 25, 2007 || Catalina || CSS || — || align=right | 1.1 km || 
|-id=100 bgcolor=#fefefe
| 278100 ||  || — || January 26, 2007 || Kitt Peak || Spacewatch || — || align=right | 1.2 km || 
|}

278101–278200 

|-bgcolor=#fefefe
| 278101 ||  || — || January 26, 2007 || Kitt Peak || Spacewatch || — || align=right data-sort-value="0.92" | 920 m || 
|-id=102 bgcolor=#fefefe
| 278102 ||  || — || January 24, 2007 || Kitt Peak || Spacewatch || MAS || align=right data-sort-value="0.78" | 780 m || 
|-id=103 bgcolor=#E9E9E9
| 278103 ||  || — || January 24, 2007 || Socorro || LINEAR || — || align=right | 2.1 km || 
|-id=104 bgcolor=#fefefe
| 278104 ||  || — || January 27, 2007 || Mount Lemmon || Mount Lemmon Survey || — || align=right | 1.0 km || 
|-id=105 bgcolor=#fefefe
| 278105 ||  || — || January 27, 2007 || Mount Lemmon || Mount Lemmon Survey || NYS || align=right data-sort-value="0.88" | 880 m || 
|-id=106 bgcolor=#d6d6d6
| 278106 ||  || — || January 27, 2007 || Kitt Peak || Spacewatch || 7:4 || align=right | 6.2 km || 
|-id=107 bgcolor=#fefefe
| 278107 ||  || — || January 28, 2007 || Mount Lemmon || Mount Lemmon Survey || NYS || align=right data-sort-value="0.81" | 810 m || 
|-id=108 bgcolor=#E9E9E9
| 278108 ||  || — || January 28, 2007 || Mount Lemmon || Mount Lemmon Survey || — || align=right | 2.3 km || 
|-id=109 bgcolor=#fefefe
| 278109 ||  || — || January 16, 2007 || Catalina || CSS || V || align=right data-sort-value="0.88" | 880 m || 
|-id=110 bgcolor=#fefefe
| 278110 ||  || — || January 29, 2007 || Kitt Peak || Spacewatch || — || align=right data-sort-value="0.86" | 860 m || 
|-id=111 bgcolor=#fefefe
| 278111 ||  || — || January 19, 2007 || Mauna Kea || Mauna Kea Obs. || FLO || align=right data-sort-value="0.53" | 530 m || 
|-id=112 bgcolor=#fefefe
| 278112 ||  || — || February 5, 2007 || Palomar || NEAT || — || align=right data-sort-value="0.86" | 860 m || 
|-id=113 bgcolor=#fefefe
| 278113 ||  || — || February 6, 2007 || Kitt Peak || Spacewatch || MAS || align=right data-sort-value="0.66" | 660 m || 
|-id=114 bgcolor=#fefefe
| 278114 ||  || — || February 6, 2007 || Kitt Peak || Spacewatch || V || align=right data-sort-value="0.83" | 830 m || 
|-id=115 bgcolor=#fefefe
| 278115 ||  || — || February 6, 2007 || Kitt Peak || Spacewatch || MAS || align=right data-sort-value="0.80" | 800 m || 
|-id=116 bgcolor=#fefefe
| 278116 ||  || — || February 6, 2007 || Mount Lemmon || Mount Lemmon Survey || — || align=right | 1.1 km || 
|-id=117 bgcolor=#fefefe
| 278117 ||  || — || February 6, 2007 || Mount Lemmon || Mount Lemmon Survey || MAS || align=right data-sort-value="0.63" | 630 m || 
|-id=118 bgcolor=#fefefe
| 278118 ||  || — || February 6, 2007 || Kitt Peak || Spacewatch || MAS || align=right data-sort-value="0.76" | 760 m || 
|-id=119 bgcolor=#d6d6d6
| 278119 ||  || — || February 6, 2007 || Mount Lemmon || Mount Lemmon Survey || EOS || align=right | 2.4 km || 
|-id=120 bgcolor=#fefefe
| 278120 ||  || — || February 6, 2007 || Kitt Peak || Spacewatch || — || align=right data-sort-value="0.94" | 940 m || 
|-id=121 bgcolor=#E9E9E9
| 278121 ||  || — || February 7, 2007 || Kitt Peak || Spacewatch || — || align=right | 2.0 km || 
|-id=122 bgcolor=#fefefe
| 278122 ||  || — || February 5, 2007 || Palomar || NEAT || — || align=right | 1.4 km || 
|-id=123 bgcolor=#fefefe
| 278123 ||  || — || February 6, 2007 || Palomar || NEAT || — || align=right data-sort-value="0.76" | 760 m || 
|-id=124 bgcolor=#fefefe
| 278124 ||  || — || February 6, 2007 || Kitt Peak || Spacewatch || MAS || align=right data-sort-value="0.90" | 900 m || 
|-id=125 bgcolor=#fefefe
| 278125 ||  || — || February 6, 2007 || Mount Lemmon || Mount Lemmon Survey || — || align=right data-sort-value="0.75" | 750 m || 
|-id=126 bgcolor=#fefefe
| 278126 ||  || — || February 6, 2007 || Palomar || NEAT || — || align=right data-sort-value="0.91" | 910 m || 
|-id=127 bgcolor=#fefefe
| 278127 ||  || — || February 6, 2007 || Kitt Peak || Spacewatch || V || align=right data-sort-value="0.86" | 860 m || 
|-id=128 bgcolor=#fefefe
| 278128 ||  || — || February 6, 2007 || Mount Lemmon || Mount Lemmon Survey || — || align=right data-sort-value="0.76" | 760 m || 
|-id=129 bgcolor=#E9E9E9
| 278129 ||  || — || February 8, 2007 || Palomar || NEAT || — || align=right | 2.6 km || 
|-id=130 bgcolor=#fefefe
| 278130 ||  || — || February 8, 2007 || Palomar || NEAT || NYS || align=right data-sort-value="0.84" | 840 m || 
|-id=131 bgcolor=#fefefe
| 278131 ||  || — || February 8, 2007 || Palomar || NEAT || — || align=right | 1.3 km || 
|-id=132 bgcolor=#fefefe
| 278132 ||  || — || February 8, 2007 || Palomar || NEAT || V || align=right data-sort-value="0.81" | 810 m || 
|-id=133 bgcolor=#fefefe
| 278133 ||  || — || February 10, 2007 || Mount Lemmon || Mount Lemmon Survey || NYS || align=right data-sort-value="0.70" | 700 m || 
|-id=134 bgcolor=#fefefe
| 278134 ||  || — || February 11, 2007 || Antares || ARO || — || align=right data-sort-value="0.79" | 790 m || 
|-id=135 bgcolor=#E9E9E9
| 278135 ||  || — || February 8, 2007 || Palomar || NEAT || — || align=right | 1.4 km || 
|-id=136 bgcolor=#d6d6d6
| 278136 ||  || — || February 9, 2007 || Catalina || CSS || — || align=right | 4.1 km || 
|-id=137 bgcolor=#fefefe
| 278137 ||  || — || February 10, 2007 || Palomar || NEAT || V || align=right data-sort-value="0.75" | 750 m || 
|-id=138 bgcolor=#fefefe
| 278138 ||  || — || February 10, 2007 || Mount Lemmon || Mount Lemmon Survey || NYS || align=right data-sort-value="0.81" | 810 m || 
|-id=139 bgcolor=#fefefe
| 278139 ||  || — || February 13, 2007 || Socorro || LINEAR || V || align=right data-sort-value="0.86" | 860 m || 
|-id=140 bgcolor=#fefefe
| 278140 ||  || — || February 10, 2007 || Catalina || CSS || FLO || align=right data-sort-value="0.85" | 850 m || 
|-id=141 bgcolor=#fefefe
| 278141 Tatooine ||  ||  || February 15, 2007 || Taunus || S. Karge, E. Schwab || NYS || align=right data-sort-value="0.90" | 900 m || 
|-id=142 bgcolor=#fefefe
| 278142 ||  || — || February 10, 2007 || Catalina || CSS || — || align=right | 1.0 km || 
|-id=143 bgcolor=#fefefe
| 278143 ||  || — || February 13, 2007 || Socorro || LINEAR || MAS || align=right data-sort-value="0.88" | 880 m || 
|-id=144 bgcolor=#fefefe
| 278144 ||  || — || February 8, 2007 || Kitt Peak || Spacewatch || NYS || align=right data-sort-value="0.65" | 650 m || 
|-id=145 bgcolor=#d6d6d6
| 278145 ||  || — || February 9, 2007 || Catalina || CSS || EUP || align=right | 4.9 km || 
|-id=146 bgcolor=#fefefe
| 278146 ||  || — || February 16, 2007 || Catalina || CSS || NYS || align=right | 2.2 km || 
|-id=147 bgcolor=#fefefe
| 278147 ||  || — || February 16, 2007 || Catalina || CSS || — || align=right data-sort-value="0.85" | 850 m || 
|-id=148 bgcolor=#d6d6d6
| 278148 ||  || — || February 17, 2007 || Kitt Peak || Spacewatch || VER || align=right | 3.2 km || 
|-id=149 bgcolor=#fefefe
| 278149 ||  || — || February 16, 2007 || Catalina || CSS || V || align=right data-sort-value="0.83" | 830 m || 
|-id=150 bgcolor=#fefefe
| 278150 ||  || — || February 17, 2007 || Kitt Peak || Spacewatch || — || align=right data-sort-value="0.94" | 940 m || 
|-id=151 bgcolor=#fefefe
| 278151 ||  || — || February 17, 2007 || Kitt Peak || Spacewatch || — || align=right data-sort-value="0.80" | 800 m || 
|-id=152 bgcolor=#fefefe
| 278152 ||  || — || February 17, 2007 || Kitt Peak || Spacewatch || NYS || align=right data-sort-value="0.88" | 880 m || 
|-id=153 bgcolor=#E9E9E9
| 278153 ||  || — || April 6, 1995 || Kitt Peak || Spacewatch || — || align=right | 1.0 km || 
|-id=154 bgcolor=#fefefe
| 278154 ||  || — || February 17, 2007 || Kitt Peak || Spacewatch || FLO || align=right data-sort-value="0.84" | 840 m || 
|-id=155 bgcolor=#fefefe
| 278155 ||  || — || February 17, 2007 || Kitt Peak || Spacewatch || MAS || align=right data-sort-value="0.70" | 700 m || 
|-id=156 bgcolor=#fefefe
| 278156 ||  || — || February 17, 2007 || Kitt Peak || Spacewatch || V || align=right data-sort-value="0.62" | 620 m || 
|-id=157 bgcolor=#fefefe
| 278157 ||  || — || February 17, 2007 || Kitt Peak || Spacewatch || — || align=right data-sort-value="0.96" | 960 m || 
|-id=158 bgcolor=#fefefe
| 278158 ||  || — || February 17, 2007 || Kitt Peak || Spacewatch || V || align=right data-sort-value="0.87" | 870 m || 
|-id=159 bgcolor=#fefefe
| 278159 ||  || — || February 17, 2007 || Kitt Peak || Spacewatch || NYS || align=right data-sort-value="0.83" | 830 m || 
|-id=160 bgcolor=#fefefe
| 278160 ||  || — || February 17, 2007 || Kitt Peak || Spacewatch || NYS || align=right data-sort-value="0.94" | 940 m || 
|-id=161 bgcolor=#fefefe
| 278161 ||  || — || February 17, 2007 || Kitt Peak || Spacewatch || — || align=right | 1.1 km || 
|-id=162 bgcolor=#fefefe
| 278162 ||  || — || February 17, 2007 || Kitt Peak || Spacewatch || V || align=right data-sort-value="0.80" | 800 m || 
|-id=163 bgcolor=#C2FFFF
| 278163 ||  || — || February 17, 2007 || Kitt Peak || Spacewatch || L5 || align=right | 11 km || 
|-id=164 bgcolor=#E9E9E9
| 278164 ||  || — || February 17, 2007 || Kitt Peak || Spacewatch || — || align=right | 3.5 km || 
|-id=165 bgcolor=#fefefe
| 278165 ||  || — || February 20, 2007 || Lulin Observatory || LUSS || H || align=right data-sort-value="0.70" | 700 m || 
|-id=166 bgcolor=#fefefe
| 278166 ||  || — || February 19, 2007 || Mount Lemmon || Mount Lemmon Survey || — || align=right data-sort-value="0.96" | 960 m || 
|-id=167 bgcolor=#fefefe
| 278167 ||  || — || February 21, 2007 || Socorro || LINEAR || NYS || align=right data-sort-value="0.69" | 690 m || 
|-id=168 bgcolor=#fefefe
| 278168 ||  || — || February 21, 2007 || Socorro || LINEAR || NYS || align=right data-sort-value="0.76" | 760 m || 
|-id=169 bgcolor=#fefefe
| 278169 ||  || — || February 21, 2007 || Kitt Peak || Spacewatch || NYS || align=right | 2.0 km || 
|-id=170 bgcolor=#E9E9E9
| 278170 ||  || — || February 21, 2007 || Socorro || LINEAR || — || align=right | 3.1 km || 
|-id=171 bgcolor=#fefefe
| 278171 ||  || — || February 21, 2007 || Kitt Peak || Spacewatch || NYS || align=right data-sort-value="0.78" | 780 m || 
|-id=172 bgcolor=#E9E9E9
| 278172 ||  || — || November 10, 2005 || Kitt Peak || Spacewatch || — || align=right | 1.8 km || 
|-id=173 bgcolor=#fefefe
| 278173 ||  || — || February 23, 2007 || Kitt Peak || Spacewatch || — || align=right data-sort-value="0.94" | 940 m || 
|-id=174 bgcolor=#E9E9E9
| 278174 ||  || — || February 23, 2007 || Socorro || LINEAR || — || align=right | 2.0 km || 
|-id=175 bgcolor=#fefefe
| 278175 ||  || — || February 23, 2007 || Socorro || LINEAR || V || align=right data-sort-value="0.84" | 840 m || 
|-id=176 bgcolor=#fefefe
| 278176 ||  || — || February 23, 2007 || Kitt Peak || Spacewatch || MAS || align=right data-sort-value="0.75" | 750 m || 
|-id=177 bgcolor=#fefefe
| 278177 ||  || — || February 21, 2007 || Kitt Peak || Spacewatch || NYS || align=right data-sort-value="0.79" | 790 m || 
|-id=178 bgcolor=#fefefe
| 278178 ||  || — || February 23, 2007 || Kitt Peak || Spacewatch || MAS || align=right data-sort-value="0.93" | 930 m || 
|-id=179 bgcolor=#E9E9E9
| 278179 ||  || — || February 23, 2007 || Kitt Peak || Spacewatch || EUN || align=right | 2.0 km || 
|-id=180 bgcolor=#E9E9E9
| 278180 ||  || — || February 23, 2007 || Mount Lemmon || Mount Lemmon Survey || NEM || align=right | 3.0 km || 
|-id=181 bgcolor=#E9E9E9
| 278181 ||  || — || February 23, 2007 || Kitt Peak || Spacewatch || — || align=right data-sort-value="0.91" | 910 m || 
|-id=182 bgcolor=#fefefe
| 278182 ||  || — || February 23, 2007 || Kitt Peak || Spacewatch || — || align=right | 2.1 km || 
|-id=183 bgcolor=#fefefe
| 278183 ||  || — || February 23, 2007 || Kitt Peak || Spacewatch || NYS || align=right data-sort-value="0.72" | 720 m || 
|-id=184 bgcolor=#fefefe
| 278184 ||  || — || February 25, 2007 || Mount Lemmon || Mount Lemmon Survey || MAS || align=right data-sort-value="0.86" | 860 m || 
|-id=185 bgcolor=#fefefe
| 278185 ||  || — || February 25, 2007 || Mount Lemmon || Mount Lemmon Survey || — || align=right | 1.1 km || 
|-id=186 bgcolor=#fefefe
| 278186 ||  || — || February 23, 2007 || Mount Lemmon || Mount Lemmon Survey || — || align=right data-sort-value="0.75" | 750 m || 
|-id=187 bgcolor=#fefefe
| 278187 ||  || — || February 21, 2007 || Kitt Peak || Spacewatch || MAS || align=right data-sort-value="0.95" | 950 m || 
|-id=188 bgcolor=#fefefe
| 278188 ||  || — || February 22, 2007 || Kitt Peak || Spacewatch || — || align=right data-sort-value="0.88" | 880 m || 
|-id=189 bgcolor=#fefefe
| 278189 ||  || — || February 26, 2007 || Mount Lemmon || Mount Lemmon Survey || NYS || align=right data-sort-value="0.87" | 870 m || 
|-id=190 bgcolor=#fefefe
| 278190 ||  || — || March 9, 2007 || Kitt Peak || Spacewatch || NYS || align=right data-sort-value="0.64" | 640 m || 
|-id=191 bgcolor=#fefefe
| 278191 ||  || — || March 9, 2007 || Kitt Peak || Spacewatch || — || align=right data-sort-value="0.87" | 870 m || 
|-id=192 bgcolor=#E9E9E9
| 278192 ||  || — || March 9, 2007 || Kitt Peak || Spacewatch || — || align=right | 1.8 km || 
|-id=193 bgcolor=#fefefe
| 278193 ||  || — || March 9, 2007 || Palomar || NEAT || — || align=right data-sort-value="0.94" | 940 m || 
|-id=194 bgcolor=#fefefe
| 278194 ||  || — || March 9, 2007 || Kitt Peak || Spacewatch || MAS || align=right data-sort-value="0.74" | 740 m || 
|-id=195 bgcolor=#fefefe
| 278195 ||  || — || March 9, 2007 || Palomar || NEAT || V || align=right data-sort-value="0.98" | 980 m || 
|-id=196 bgcolor=#fefefe
| 278196 ||  || — || March 9, 2007 || Palomar || NEAT || — || align=right | 1.3 km || 
|-id=197 bgcolor=#d6d6d6
| 278197 Touvron ||  ||  || March 9, 2007 || Nogales || J.-C. Merlin || — || align=right | 4.5 km || 
|-id=198 bgcolor=#fefefe
| 278198 ||  || — || March 9, 2007 || Goodricke-Pigott || R. A. Tucker || MAS || align=right | 1.1 km || 
|-id=199 bgcolor=#fefefe
| 278199 ||  || — || March 10, 2007 || Mount Lemmon || Mount Lemmon Survey || — || align=right | 1.0 km || 
|-id=200 bgcolor=#d6d6d6
| 278200 Olegpopov ||  ||  || March 11, 2007 || Wildberg || R. Apitzsch || — || align=right | 2.4 km || 
|}

278201–278300 

|-bgcolor=#fefefe
| 278201 ||  || — || March 9, 2007 || Palomar || NEAT || — || align=right data-sort-value="0.75" | 750 m || 
|-id=202 bgcolor=#fefefe
| 278202 ||  || — || March 10, 2007 || Kitt Peak || Spacewatch || NYS || align=right data-sort-value="0.70" | 700 m || 
|-id=203 bgcolor=#fefefe
| 278203 ||  || — || March 10, 2007 || Kitt Peak || Spacewatch || NYS || align=right data-sort-value="0.55" | 550 m || 
|-id=204 bgcolor=#fefefe
| 278204 ||  || — || March 10, 2007 || Eskridge || G. Hug || NYS || align=right data-sort-value="0.80" | 800 m || 
|-id=205 bgcolor=#E9E9E9
| 278205 ||  || — || March 10, 2007 || Eskridge || G. Hug || — || align=right | 1.9 km || 
|-id=206 bgcolor=#fefefe
| 278206 ||  || — || March 10, 2007 || Palomar || NEAT || NYS || align=right data-sort-value="0.92" | 920 m || 
|-id=207 bgcolor=#fefefe
| 278207 ||  || — || March 11, 2007 || Kitt Peak || Spacewatch || FLO || align=right data-sort-value="0.89" | 890 m || 
|-id=208 bgcolor=#fefefe
| 278208 ||  || — || March 11, 2007 || Mount Lemmon || Mount Lemmon Survey || NYS || align=right data-sort-value="0.68" | 680 m || 
|-id=209 bgcolor=#fefefe
| 278209 ||  || — || March 11, 2007 || Mount Lemmon || Mount Lemmon Survey || — || align=right | 1.0 km || 
|-id=210 bgcolor=#fefefe
| 278210 ||  || — || March 11, 2007 || Kitt Peak || Spacewatch || — || align=right | 1.0 km || 
|-id=211 bgcolor=#fefefe
| 278211 ||  || — || March 11, 2007 || Vicques || M. Ory || NYS || align=right data-sort-value="0.75" | 750 m || 
|-id=212 bgcolor=#fefefe
| 278212 ||  || — || March 9, 2007 || Kitt Peak || Spacewatch || — || align=right | 1.9 km || 
|-id=213 bgcolor=#fefefe
| 278213 ||  || — || March 9, 2007 || Kitt Peak || Spacewatch || — || align=right | 1.2 km || 
|-id=214 bgcolor=#E9E9E9
| 278214 ||  || — || March 9, 2007 || Kitt Peak || Spacewatch || — || align=right | 2.9 km || 
|-id=215 bgcolor=#fefefe
| 278215 ||  || — || March 9, 2007 || Kitt Peak || Spacewatch || — || align=right | 1.1 km || 
|-id=216 bgcolor=#fefefe
| 278216 ||  || — || March 9, 2007 || Kitt Peak || Spacewatch || MAS || align=right data-sort-value="0.94" | 940 m || 
|-id=217 bgcolor=#fefefe
| 278217 ||  || — || March 12, 2007 || Kitt Peak || Spacewatch || MAS || align=right data-sort-value="0.75" | 750 m || 
|-id=218 bgcolor=#fefefe
| 278218 ||  || — || March 10, 2007 || Kitt Peak || Spacewatch || MAS || align=right data-sort-value="0.75" | 750 m || 
|-id=219 bgcolor=#fefefe
| 278219 ||  || — || March 10, 2007 || Palomar || NEAT || V || align=right data-sort-value="0.94" | 940 m || 
|-id=220 bgcolor=#E9E9E9
| 278220 ||  || — || March 10, 2007 || Kitt Peak || Spacewatch || EUN || align=right | 1.2 km || 
|-id=221 bgcolor=#E9E9E9
| 278221 ||  || — || March 10, 2007 || Palomar || NEAT || — || align=right | 2.2 km || 
|-id=222 bgcolor=#E9E9E9
| 278222 ||  || — || March 10, 2007 || Palomar || NEAT || — || align=right | 2.1 km || 
|-id=223 bgcolor=#E9E9E9
| 278223 ||  || — || March 11, 2007 || Kitt Peak || Spacewatch || — || align=right | 2.0 km || 
|-id=224 bgcolor=#E9E9E9
| 278224 ||  || — || March 12, 2007 || Kitt Peak || Spacewatch || MAR || align=right | 1.2 km || 
|-id=225 bgcolor=#fefefe
| 278225 Didierpelat ||  ||  || March 12, 2007 || Saint-Sulpice || B. Christophe || — || align=right data-sort-value="0.94" | 940 m || 
|-id=226 bgcolor=#fefefe
| 278226 ||  || — || March 9, 2007 || Mount Lemmon || Mount Lemmon Survey || V || align=right data-sort-value="0.76" | 760 m || 
|-id=227 bgcolor=#fefefe
| 278227 ||  || — || March 10, 2007 || Mount Lemmon || Mount Lemmon Survey || NYS || align=right | 1.1 km || 
|-id=228 bgcolor=#E9E9E9
| 278228 ||  || — || March 11, 2007 || Kitt Peak || Spacewatch || MIS || align=right | 2.4 km || 
|-id=229 bgcolor=#E9E9E9
| 278229 ||  || — || March 11, 2007 || Kitt Peak || Spacewatch || HEN || align=right | 1.1 km || 
|-id=230 bgcolor=#E9E9E9
| 278230 ||  || — || March 11, 2007 || Kitt Peak || Spacewatch || WIT || align=right | 1.5 km || 
|-id=231 bgcolor=#E9E9E9
| 278231 ||  || — || March 11, 2007 || Kitt Peak || Spacewatch || AEO || align=right | 1.6 km || 
|-id=232 bgcolor=#fefefe
| 278232 ||  || — || March 11, 2007 || Kitt Peak || Spacewatch || — || align=right data-sort-value="0.81" | 810 m || 
|-id=233 bgcolor=#fefefe
| 278233 ||  || — || March 13, 2007 || Mount Lemmon || Mount Lemmon Survey || — || align=right | 1.0 km || 
|-id=234 bgcolor=#E9E9E9
| 278234 ||  || — || March 13, 2007 || Mount Lemmon || Mount Lemmon Survey || — || align=right | 1.1 km || 
|-id=235 bgcolor=#E9E9E9
| 278235 ||  || — || March 13, 2007 || Mount Lemmon || Mount Lemmon Survey || KON || align=right | 2.5 km || 
|-id=236 bgcolor=#E9E9E9
| 278236 ||  || — || March 14, 2007 || Mount Lemmon || Mount Lemmon Survey || — || align=right | 1.8 km || 
|-id=237 bgcolor=#E9E9E9
| 278237 ||  || — || March 10, 2007 || Palomar || NEAT || — || align=right | 1.3 km || 
|-id=238 bgcolor=#fefefe
| 278238 ||  || — || March 12, 2007 || Kitt Peak || Spacewatch || NYS || align=right data-sort-value="0.87" | 870 m || 
|-id=239 bgcolor=#fefefe
| 278239 ||  || — || March 12, 2007 || Mount Lemmon || Mount Lemmon Survey || — || align=right data-sort-value="0.91" | 910 m || 
|-id=240 bgcolor=#E9E9E9
| 278240 ||  || — || March 12, 2007 || Kitt Peak || Spacewatch || — || align=right | 1.7 km || 
|-id=241 bgcolor=#fefefe
| 278241 ||  || — || March 12, 2007 || Mount Lemmon || Mount Lemmon Survey || — || align=right | 1.0 km || 
|-id=242 bgcolor=#fefefe
| 278242 ||  || — || March 12, 2007 || Mount Lemmon || Mount Lemmon Survey || NYS || align=right data-sort-value="0.84" | 840 m || 
|-id=243 bgcolor=#fefefe
| 278243 ||  || — || March 12, 2007 || Mount Lemmon || Mount Lemmon Survey || FLO || align=right data-sort-value="0.88" | 880 m || 
|-id=244 bgcolor=#d6d6d6
| 278244 ||  || — || March 12, 2007 || Mount Lemmon || Mount Lemmon Survey || HYG || align=right | 3.8 km || 
|-id=245 bgcolor=#E9E9E9
| 278245 ||  || — || March 12, 2007 || Mount Lemmon || Mount Lemmon Survey || NEM || align=right | 2.6 km || 
|-id=246 bgcolor=#fefefe
| 278246 ||  || — || March 12, 2007 || Kitt Peak || Spacewatch || V || align=right data-sort-value="0.94" | 940 m || 
|-id=247 bgcolor=#E9E9E9
| 278247 ||  || — || March 11, 2007 || Kitt Peak || Spacewatch || EUN || align=right | 1.9 km || 
|-id=248 bgcolor=#E9E9E9
| 278248 ||  || — || March 13, 2007 || Kitt Peak || Spacewatch || — || align=right data-sort-value="0.93" | 930 m || 
|-id=249 bgcolor=#fefefe
| 278249 ||  || — || March 13, 2007 || Kitt Peak || Spacewatch || — || align=right | 1.2 km || 
|-id=250 bgcolor=#fefefe
| 278250 ||  || — || March 15, 2007 || Kitt Peak || Spacewatch || — || align=right data-sort-value="0.79" | 790 m || 
|-id=251 bgcolor=#fefefe
| 278251 ||  || — || March 14, 2007 || Catalina || CSS || NYS || align=right data-sort-value="0.79" | 790 m || 
|-id=252 bgcolor=#fefefe
| 278252 ||  || — || March 13, 2007 || Mount Lemmon || Mount Lemmon Survey || NYS || align=right data-sort-value="0.94" | 940 m || 
|-id=253 bgcolor=#E9E9E9
| 278253 ||  || — || March 13, 2007 || Mount Lemmon || Mount Lemmon Survey || — || align=right | 1.5 km || 
|-id=254 bgcolor=#E9E9E9
| 278254 ||  || — || March 13, 2007 || Kitt Peak || Spacewatch || — || align=right | 1.1 km || 
|-id=255 bgcolor=#fefefe
| 278255 ||  || — || March 10, 2007 || Palomar || NEAT || NYS || align=right data-sort-value="0.69" | 690 m || 
|-id=256 bgcolor=#fefefe
| 278256 ||  || — || March 8, 2007 || Palomar || NEAT || NYS || align=right data-sort-value="0.65" | 650 m || 
|-id=257 bgcolor=#E9E9E9
| 278257 ||  || — || March 10, 2007 || Mount Lemmon || Mount Lemmon Survey || — || align=right | 3.2 km || 
|-id=258 bgcolor=#fefefe
| 278258 ||  || — || March 10, 2007 || Mount Lemmon || Mount Lemmon Survey || NYS || align=right data-sort-value="0.82" | 820 m || 
|-id=259 bgcolor=#E9E9E9
| 278259 ||  || — || March 14, 2007 || Catalina || CSS || BRU || align=right | 3.6 km || 
|-id=260 bgcolor=#E9E9E9
| 278260 ||  || — || March 13, 2007 || Kitt Peak || Spacewatch || AGN || align=right | 1.5 km || 
|-id=261 bgcolor=#fefefe
| 278261 ||  || — || March 15, 2007 || Kitt Peak || Spacewatch || NYS || align=right data-sort-value="0.77" | 770 m || 
|-id=262 bgcolor=#fefefe
| 278262 ||  || — || March 15, 2007 || Kitt Peak || Spacewatch || MAS || align=right data-sort-value="0.85" | 850 m || 
|-id=263 bgcolor=#fefefe
| 278263 ||  || — || March 16, 2007 || Mount Lemmon || Mount Lemmon Survey || MAS || align=right | 1.0 km || 
|-id=264 bgcolor=#fefefe
| 278264 ||  || — || March 16, 2007 || Mount Lemmon || Mount Lemmon Survey || NYS || align=right data-sort-value="0.81" | 810 m || 
|-id=265 bgcolor=#fefefe
| 278265 ||  || — || March 20, 2007 || Kitt Peak || Spacewatch || NYS || align=right data-sort-value="0.78" | 780 m || 
|-id=266 bgcolor=#E9E9E9
| 278266 ||  || — || March 20, 2007 || Mount Lemmon || Mount Lemmon Survey || — || align=right | 1.9 km || 
|-id=267 bgcolor=#E9E9E9
| 278267 ||  || — || March 20, 2007 || Mount Lemmon || Mount Lemmon Survey || — || align=right data-sort-value="0.88" | 880 m || 
|-id=268 bgcolor=#E9E9E9
| 278268 ||  || — || March 20, 2007 || Kitt Peak || Spacewatch || — || align=right | 1.8 km || 
|-id=269 bgcolor=#E9E9E9
| 278269 ||  || — || March 25, 2007 || Mount Lemmon || Mount Lemmon Survey || — || align=right | 1.2 km || 
|-id=270 bgcolor=#E9E9E9
| 278270 ||  || — || March 26, 2007 || Mount Lemmon || Mount Lemmon Survey || — || align=right | 1.9 km || 
|-id=271 bgcolor=#fefefe
| 278271 ||  || — || March 26, 2007 || Mount Lemmon || Mount Lemmon Survey || — || align=right data-sort-value="0.99" | 990 m || 
|-id=272 bgcolor=#E9E9E9
| 278272 ||  || — || March 29, 2007 || Palomar || NEAT || — || align=right | 2.1 km || 
|-id=273 bgcolor=#E9E9E9
| 278273 ||  || — || March 26, 2007 || Kitt Peak || Spacewatch || — || align=right | 1.9 km || 
|-id=274 bgcolor=#E9E9E9
| 278274 ||  || — || March 25, 2007 || Mount Lemmon || Mount Lemmon Survey || GEF || align=right | 2.0 km || 
|-id=275 bgcolor=#E9E9E9
| 278275 ||  || — || April 10, 2007 || Altschwendt || W. Ries || — || align=right data-sort-value="0.98" | 980 m || 
|-id=276 bgcolor=#fefefe
| 278276 ||  || — || April 11, 2007 || Kitt Peak || Spacewatch || FLO || align=right data-sort-value="0.78" | 780 m || 
|-id=277 bgcolor=#E9E9E9
| 278277 ||  || — || April 11, 2007 || Kitt Peak || Spacewatch || — || align=right | 1.0 km || 
|-id=278 bgcolor=#E9E9E9
| 278278 ||  || — || April 11, 2007 || Kitt Peak || Spacewatch || — || align=right | 1.5 km || 
|-id=279 bgcolor=#E9E9E9
| 278279 ||  || — || April 11, 2007 || Kitt Peak || Spacewatch || — || align=right | 1.3 km || 
|-id=280 bgcolor=#E9E9E9
| 278280 ||  || — || April 11, 2007 || Mount Lemmon || Mount Lemmon Survey || — || align=right data-sort-value="0.98" | 980 m || 
|-id=281 bgcolor=#E9E9E9
| 278281 ||  || — || April 11, 2007 || Kitt Peak || Spacewatch || — || align=right | 1.1 km || 
|-id=282 bgcolor=#E9E9E9
| 278282 ||  || — || April 14, 2007 || Kitt Peak || Spacewatch || — || align=right | 1.3 km || 
|-id=283 bgcolor=#d6d6d6
| 278283 ||  || — || April 15, 2007 || Vicques || M. Ory || — || align=right | 4.7 km || 
|-id=284 bgcolor=#E9E9E9
| 278284 ||  || — || April 15, 2007 || Catalina || CSS || — || align=right | 1.9 km || 
|-id=285 bgcolor=#E9E9E9
| 278285 ||  || — || April 11, 2007 || Mount Lemmon || Mount Lemmon Survey || KON || align=right | 2.2 km || 
|-id=286 bgcolor=#E9E9E9
| 278286 ||  || — || April 14, 2007 || Kitt Peak || Spacewatch || — || align=right data-sort-value="0.97" | 970 m || 
|-id=287 bgcolor=#E9E9E9
| 278287 ||  || — || April 14, 2007 || Kitt Peak || Spacewatch || — || align=right | 2.2 km || 
|-id=288 bgcolor=#E9E9E9
| 278288 ||  || — || April 14, 2007 || Kitt Peak || Spacewatch || — || align=right | 1.3 km || 
|-id=289 bgcolor=#E9E9E9
| 278289 ||  || — || April 14, 2007 || Kitt Peak || Spacewatch || — || align=right | 1.1 km || 
|-id=290 bgcolor=#E9E9E9
| 278290 ||  || — || April 14, 2007 || Mount Lemmon || Mount Lemmon Survey || EUN || align=right | 1.3 km || 
|-id=291 bgcolor=#E9E9E9
| 278291 ||  || — || March 14, 2007 || Catalina || CSS || EUN || align=right | 1.6 km || 
|-id=292 bgcolor=#E9E9E9
| 278292 ||  || — || April 15, 2007 || Socorro || LINEAR || — || align=right | 1.7 km || 
|-id=293 bgcolor=#E9E9E9
| 278293 ||  || — || April 15, 2007 || Kitt Peak || Spacewatch || — || align=right | 1.0 km || 
|-id=294 bgcolor=#fefefe
| 278294 ||  || — || April 14, 2007 || Kitt Peak || Spacewatch || — || align=right | 1.1 km || 
|-id=295 bgcolor=#E9E9E9
| 278295 ||  || — || April 15, 2007 || Kitt Peak || Spacewatch || — || align=right | 1.0 km || 
|-id=296 bgcolor=#E9E9E9
| 278296 ||  || — || April 15, 2007 || Kitt Peak || Spacewatch || AGN || align=right | 1.2 km || 
|-id=297 bgcolor=#E9E9E9
| 278297 ||  || — || April 15, 2007 || Kitt Peak || Spacewatch || — || align=right data-sort-value="0.98" | 980 m || 
|-id=298 bgcolor=#E9E9E9
| 278298 ||  || — || April 15, 2007 || Kitt Peak || Spacewatch || — || align=right | 1.0 km || 
|-id=299 bgcolor=#E9E9E9
| 278299 ||  || — || April 15, 2007 || Kitt Peak || Spacewatch || — || align=right | 1.1 km || 
|-id=300 bgcolor=#E9E9E9
| 278300 ||  || — || April 15, 2007 || Kitt Peak || Spacewatch || — || align=right | 2.0 km || 
|}

278301–278400 

|-bgcolor=#fefefe
| 278301 ||  || — || April 15, 2007 || Catalina || CSS || V || align=right | 1.0 km || 
|-id=302 bgcolor=#E9E9E9
| 278302 ||  || — || April 11, 2007 || Kitt Peak || Spacewatch || — || align=right | 2.1 km || 
|-id=303 bgcolor=#E9E9E9
| 278303 ||  || — || April 17, 2007 || Vicques || M. Ory || — || align=right | 1.1 km || 
|-id=304 bgcolor=#d6d6d6
| 278304 ||  || — || April 18, 2007 || Mount Lemmon || Mount Lemmon Survey || KAR || align=right | 1.1 km || 
|-id=305 bgcolor=#E9E9E9
| 278305 ||  || — || April 18, 2007 || Mount Lemmon || Mount Lemmon Survey || — || align=right | 1.1 km || 
|-id=306 bgcolor=#E9E9E9
| 278306 ||  || — || April 18, 2007 || Kitt Peak || Spacewatch || RAF || align=right data-sort-value="0.97" | 970 m || 
|-id=307 bgcolor=#fefefe
| 278307 ||  || — || April 16, 2007 || Mount Lemmon || Mount Lemmon Survey || MAS || align=right data-sort-value="0.95" | 950 m || 
|-id=308 bgcolor=#E9E9E9
| 278308 ||  || — || April 16, 2007 || Catalina || CSS || EUN || align=right | 1.5 km || 
|-id=309 bgcolor=#E9E9E9
| 278309 ||  || — || April 19, 2007 || Mayhill || A. Lowe || — || align=right | 2.2 km || 
|-id=310 bgcolor=#E9E9E9
| 278310 ||  || — || April 16, 2007 || Catalina || CSS || INO || align=right | 1.9 km || 
|-id=311 bgcolor=#fefefe
| 278311 ||  || — || April 18, 2007 || Mount Lemmon || Mount Lemmon Survey || MAS || align=right data-sort-value="0.88" | 880 m || 
|-id=312 bgcolor=#d6d6d6
| 278312 ||  || — || April 18, 2007 || Kitt Peak || Spacewatch || — || align=right | 2.7 km || 
|-id=313 bgcolor=#E9E9E9
| 278313 ||  || — || April 18, 2007 || Kitt Peak || Spacewatch || — || align=right | 1.8 km || 
|-id=314 bgcolor=#E9E9E9
| 278314 ||  || — || April 18, 2007 || Mount Lemmon || Mount Lemmon Survey || — || align=right | 1.1 km || 
|-id=315 bgcolor=#E9E9E9
| 278315 ||  || — || April 18, 2007 || Kitt Peak || Spacewatch || — || align=right | 1.2 km || 
|-id=316 bgcolor=#E9E9E9
| 278316 ||  || — || April 18, 2007 || Kitt Peak || Spacewatch || RAF || align=right data-sort-value="0.96" | 960 m || 
|-id=317 bgcolor=#E9E9E9
| 278317 ||  || — || April 19, 2007 || Kitt Peak || Spacewatch || — || align=right | 1.0 km || 
|-id=318 bgcolor=#fefefe
| 278318 ||  || — || April 20, 2007 || Mount Lemmon || Mount Lemmon Survey || — || align=right data-sort-value="0.82" | 820 m || 
|-id=319 bgcolor=#d6d6d6
| 278319 ||  || — || April 20, 2007 || Mount Lemmon || Mount Lemmon Survey || K-2 || align=right | 1.8 km || 
|-id=320 bgcolor=#E9E9E9
| 278320 ||  || — || April 18, 2007 || Kitt Peak || Spacewatch || — || align=right data-sort-value="0.90" | 900 m || 
|-id=321 bgcolor=#fefefe
| 278321 ||  || — || April 19, 2007 || Anderson Mesa || LONEOS || V || align=right data-sort-value="0.92" | 920 m || 
|-id=322 bgcolor=#E9E9E9
| 278322 ||  || — || April 20, 2007 || Kitt Peak || Spacewatch || — || align=right | 1.7 km || 
|-id=323 bgcolor=#E9E9E9
| 278323 ||  || — || April 20, 2007 || Kitt Peak || Spacewatch || — || align=right | 1.2 km || 
|-id=324 bgcolor=#E9E9E9
| 278324 ||  || — || April 20, 2007 || Kitt Peak || Spacewatch || BRG || align=right | 2.1 km || 
|-id=325 bgcolor=#d6d6d6
| 278325 ||  || — || April 15, 2007 || Catalina || CSS || — || align=right | 4.1 km || 
|-id=326 bgcolor=#fefefe
| 278326 ||  || — || April 22, 2007 || Kitt Peak || Spacewatch || — || align=right | 1.2 km || 
|-id=327 bgcolor=#FFC2E0
| 278327 ||  || — || April 24, 2007 || Kitt Peak || Spacewatch || APO +1km || align=right | 2.9 km || 
|-id=328 bgcolor=#E9E9E9
| 278328 ||  || — || April 20, 2007 || Socorro || LINEAR || — || align=right | 1.3 km || 
|-id=329 bgcolor=#E9E9E9
| 278329 ||  || — || April 22, 2007 || Mount Lemmon || Mount Lemmon Survey || — || align=right | 2.1 km || 
|-id=330 bgcolor=#E9E9E9
| 278330 ||  || — || April 22, 2007 || Mount Lemmon || Mount Lemmon Survey || — || align=right | 2.1 km || 
|-id=331 bgcolor=#E9E9E9
| 278331 ||  || — || April 23, 2007 || Siding Spring || SSS || — || align=right | 1.5 km || 
|-id=332 bgcolor=#E9E9E9
| 278332 ||  || — || April 24, 2007 || Kitt Peak || Spacewatch || — || align=right | 2.9 km || 
|-id=333 bgcolor=#E9E9E9
| 278333 ||  || — || April 23, 2007 || Kitt Peak || Spacewatch || — || align=right | 1.2 km || 
|-id=334 bgcolor=#E9E9E9
| 278334 ||  || — || April 23, 2007 || Mount Lemmon || Mount Lemmon Survey || EUN || align=right | 1.7 km || 
|-id=335 bgcolor=#E9E9E9
| 278335 ||  || — || April 24, 2007 || Kitt Peak || Spacewatch || — || align=right | 2.3 km || 
|-id=336 bgcolor=#E9E9E9
| 278336 ||  || — || April 22, 2007 || Mount Lemmon || Mount Lemmon Survey || — || align=right | 1.0 km || 
|-id=337 bgcolor=#E9E9E9
| 278337 ||  || — || April 25, 2007 || Kitt Peak || Spacewatch || ADE || align=right | 2.3 km || 
|-id=338 bgcolor=#fefefe
| 278338 ||  || — || April 22, 2007 || Catalina Station || Catalina Stn. || MAS || align=right data-sort-value="0.69" | 690 m || 
|-id=339 bgcolor=#E9E9E9
| 278339 ||  || — || April 18, 2007 || Mount Lemmon || Mount Lemmon Survey || — || align=right | 2.0 km || 
|-id=340 bgcolor=#E9E9E9
| 278340 ||  || — || April 22, 2007 || Mount Lemmon || Mount Lemmon Survey || HNS || align=right | 2.6 km || 
|-id=341 bgcolor=#E9E9E9
| 278341 ||  || — || May 7, 2007 || Mount Lemmon || Mount Lemmon Survey || MAR || align=right | 1.2 km || 
|-id=342 bgcolor=#E9E9E9
| 278342 ||  || — || May 7, 2007 || Mount Lemmon || Mount Lemmon Survey || — || align=right | 2.2 km || 
|-id=343 bgcolor=#E9E9E9
| 278343 ||  || — || May 7, 2007 || Mount Lemmon || Mount Lemmon Survey || — || align=right | 2.3 km || 
|-id=344 bgcolor=#E9E9E9
| 278344 ||  || — || May 7, 2007 || Catalina || CSS || — || align=right | 1.2 km || 
|-id=345 bgcolor=#E9E9E9
| 278345 ||  || — || May 6, 2007 || Bergisch Gladbach || W. Bickel || — || align=right | 1.3 km || 
|-id=346 bgcolor=#E9E9E9
| 278346 ||  || — || May 7, 2007 || Catalina || CSS || EUN || align=right | 1.4 km || 
|-id=347 bgcolor=#E9E9E9
| 278347 ||  || — || May 7, 2007 || Kitt Peak || Spacewatch || — || align=right data-sort-value="0.97" | 970 m || 
|-id=348 bgcolor=#E9E9E9
| 278348 ||  || — || May 8, 2007 || Kitt Peak || Spacewatch || — || align=right | 3.5 km || 
|-id=349 bgcolor=#E9E9E9
| 278349 ||  || — || May 7, 2007 || Kitt Peak || Spacewatch || RAF || align=right | 1.2 km || 
|-id=350 bgcolor=#E9E9E9
| 278350 ||  || — || May 9, 2007 || Kitt Peak || Spacewatch || — || align=right | 1.9 km || 
|-id=351 bgcolor=#E9E9E9
| 278351 ||  || — || May 11, 2007 || Lulin || LUSS || — || align=right | 4.4 km || 
|-id=352 bgcolor=#E9E9E9
| 278352 ||  || — || May 7, 2007 || Catalina || CSS || — || align=right | 1.7 km || 
|-id=353 bgcolor=#E9E9E9
| 278353 ||  || — || May 9, 2007 || Kitt Peak || Spacewatch || MAR || align=right | 1.5 km || 
|-id=354 bgcolor=#d6d6d6
| 278354 ||  || — || May 9, 2007 || Kitt Peak || Spacewatch || THB || align=right | 3.8 km || 
|-id=355 bgcolor=#d6d6d6
| 278355 ||  || — || May 9, 2007 || Kitt Peak || Spacewatch || — || align=right | 3.0 km || 
|-id=356 bgcolor=#E9E9E9
| 278356 ||  || — || May 9, 2007 || Kitt Peak || Spacewatch || — || align=right | 2.0 km || 
|-id=357 bgcolor=#E9E9E9
| 278357 ||  || — || May 10, 2007 || Mount Lemmon || Mount Lemmon Survey || — || align=right | 1.6 km || 
|-id=358 bgcolor=#E9E9E9
| 278358 ||  || — || May 12, 2007 || Kitt Peak || Spacewatch || — || align=right | 1.4 km || 
|-id=359 bgcolor=#E9E9E9
| 278359 ||  || — || May 12, 2007 || Mount Lemmon || Mount Lemmon Survey || — || align=right | 1.6 km || 
|-id=360 bgcolor=#E9E9E9
| 278360 ||  || — || May 12, 2007 || Purple Mountain || PMO NEO || — || align=right | 3.0 km || 
|-id=361 bgcolor=#C2E0FF
| 278361 ||  || — || May 14, 2007 || Palomar || Palomar Obs. || twotino?critical || align=right | 558 km || 
|-id=362 bgcolor=#E9E9E9
| 278362 ||  || — || May 18, 2007 || Tiki || S. F. Hönig, N. Teamo || — || align=right | 2.5 km || 
|-id=363 bgcolor=#E9E9E9
| 278363 ||  || — || May 18, 2007 || Pla D'Arguines || R. Ferrando || — || align=right | 1.7 km || 
|-id=364 bgcolor=#E9E9E9
| 278364 ||  || — || May 22, 2007 || Tiki || S. F. Hönig, N. Teamo || — || align=right | 1.0 km || 
|-id=365 bgcolor=#E9E9E9
| 278365 ||  || — || May 16, 2007 || Purple Mountain || PMO NEO || — || align=right | 3.2 km || 
|-id=366 bgcolor=#E9E9E9
| 278366 ||  || — || May 21, 2007 || Anderson Mesa || LONEOS || — || align=right | 3.0 km || 
|-id=367 bgcolor=#E9E9E9
| 278367 ||  || — || May 16, 2007 || Kitt Peak || Spacewatch || — || align=right | 1.3 km || 
|-id=368 bgcolor=#E9E9E9
| 278368 ||  || — || June 7, 2007 || Kitt Peak || Spacewatch || — || align=right | 1.4 km || 
|-id=369 bgcolor=#E9E9E9
| 278369 ||  || — || June 9, 2007 || Kitt Peak || Spacewatch || — || align=right | 2.3 km || 
|-id=370 bgcolor=#E9E9E9
| 278370 ||  || — || June 7, 2007 || Kitt Peak || Spacewatch || KON || align=right | 3.2 km || 
|-id=371 bgcolor=#E9E9E9
| 278371 ||  || — || June 8, 2007 || Kitt Peak || Spacewatch || — || align=right | 1.8 km || 
|-id=372 bgcolor=#E9E9E9
| 278372 ||  || — || June 8, 2007 || Catalina || CSS || — || align=right | 2.2 km || 
|-id=373 bgcolor=#E9E9E9
| 278373 ||  || — || June 9, 2007 || Kitt Peak || Spacewatch || — || align=right | 3.0 km || 
|-id=374 bgcolor=#E9E9E9
| 278374 ||  || — || June 8, 2007 || Kitt Peak || Spacewatch || ADE || align=right | 3.9 km || 
|-id=375 bgcolor=#E9E9E9
| 278375 ||  || — || June 9, 2007 || Kitt Peak || Spacewatch || — || align=right | 2.6 km || 
|-id=376 bgcolor=#E9E9E9
| 278376 ||  || — || June 10, 2007 || Kitt Peak || Spacewatch || — || align=right | 2.8 km || 
|-id=377 bgcolor=#E9E9E9
| 278377 ||  || — || June 9, 2007 || Kitt Peak || Spacewatch || — || align=right | 1.1 km || 
|-id=378 bgcolor=#d6d6d6
| 278378 ||  || — || June 14, 2007 || Kitt Peak || Spacewatch || EOS || align=right | 2.1 km || 
|-id=379 bgcolor=#E9E9E9
| 278379 ||  || — || June 14, 2007 || Kitt Peak || Spacewatch || — || align=right | 2.3 km || 
|-id=380 bgcolor=#E9E9E9
| 278380 ||  || — || June 15, 2007 || Kitt Peak || Spacewatch || RAF || align=right | 1.1 km || 
|-id=381 bgcolor=#FFC2E0
| 278381 ||  || — || June 18, 2007 || Catalina || CSS || APOcritical || align=right data-sort-value="0.15" | 150 m || 
|-id=382 bgcolor=#E9E9E9
| 278382 ||  || — || June 18, 2007 || Kitt Peak || Spacewatch || — || align=right | 1.5 km || 
|-id=383 bgcolor=#E9E9E9
| 278383 ||  || — || June 22, 2007 || Kitt Peak || Spacewatch || — || align=right | 2.9 km || 
|-id=384 bgcolor=#E9E9E9
| 278384 Mudanjiang ||  ||  || June 24, 2007 || Lulin Observatory || Q.-z. Ye, H.-C. Lin || — || align=right | 2.5 km || 
|-id=385 bgcolor=#d6d6d6
| 278385 ||  || — || June 24, 2007 || Catalina || CSS || — || align=right | 5.9 km || 
|-id=386 bgcolor=#E9E9E9
| 278386 Sofivanna ||  ||  || July 13, 2007 || Andrushivka || Andrushivka Obs. || JUN || align=right | 1.4 km || 
|-id=387 bgcolor=#E9E9E9
| 278387 ||  || — || July 17, 2007 || La Sagra || OAM Obs. || — || align=right | 2.2 km || 
|-id=388 bgcolor=#E9E9E9
| 278388 ||  || — || July 18, 2007 || Reedy Creek || J. Broughton || — || align=right | 2.3 km || 
|-id=389 bgcolor=#fefefe
| 278389 ||  || — || August 8, 2007 || Socorro || LINEAR || NYS || align=right data-sort-value="0.87" | 870 m || 
|-id=390 bgcolor=#d6d6d6
| 278390 ||  || — || August 9, 2007 || Kitt Peak || Spacewatch || — || align=right | 2.5 km || 
|-id=391 bgcolor=#fefefe
| 278391 ||  || — || August 8, 2007 || Socorro || LINEAR || V || align=right data-sort-value="0.82" | 820 m || 
|-id=392 bgcolor=#E9E9E9
| 278392 ||  || — || August 13, 2007 || Bisei SG Center || BATTeRS || — || align=right | 2.3 km || 
|-id=393 bgcolor=#fefefe
| 278393 ||  || — || August 11, 2007 || Bergisch Gladbac || W. Bickel || — || align=right | 1.3 km || 
|-id=394 bgcolor=#d6d6d6
| 278394 ||  || — || August 10, 2007 || Kitt Peak || Spacewatch || — || align=right | 3.8 km || 
|-id=395 bgcolor=#E9E9E9
| 278395 ||  || — || August 14, 2007 || Siding Spring || SSS || — || align=right | 1.8 km || 
|-id=396 bgcolor=#d6d6d6
| 278396 ||  || — || August 10, 2007 || Kitt Peak || Spacewatch || EOS || align=right | 2.1 km || 
|-id=397 bgcolor=#E9E9E9
| 278397 ||  || — || August 18, 2007 || La Sagra || OAM Obs. || — || align=right | 3.4 km || 
|-id=398 bgcolor=#d6d6d6
| 278398 ||  || — || August 26, 2007 || Wildberg || R. Apitzsch || EOS || align=right | 2.3 km || 
|-id=399 bgcolor=#d6d6d6
| 278399 ||  || — || August 21, 2007 || Anderson Mesa || LONEOS || — || align=right | 3.3 km || 
|-id=400 bgcolor=#d6d6d6
| 278400 ||  || — || August 21, 2007 || Anderson Mesa || LONEOS || — || align=right | 4.3 km || 
|}

278401–278500 

|-bgcolor=#E9E9E9
| 278401 ||  || — || August 22, 2007 || Socorro || LINEAR || — || align=right | 2.3 km || 
|-id=402 bgcolor=#E9E9E9
| 278402 ||  || — || August 18, 2007 || Mayhill || A. Lowe || — || align=right | 3.4 km || 
|-id=403 bgcolor=#d6d6d6
| 278403 ||  || — || August 21, 2007 || Anderson Mesa || LONEOS || — || align=right | 3.6 km || 
|-id=404 bgcolor=#d6d6d6
| 278404 ||  || — || August 23, 2007 || Kitt Peak || Spacewatch || — || align=right | 3.2 km || 
|-id=405 bgcolor=#fefefe
| 278405 ||  || — || September 5, 2007 || Dauban || Chante-Perdrix Obs. || — || align=right data-sort-value="0.98" | 980 m || 
|-id=406 bgcolor=#d6d6d6
| 278406 ||  || — || September 6, 2007 || Pla D'Arguines || R. Ferrando || — || align=right | 4.1 km || 
|-id=407 bgcolor=#d6d6d6
| 278407 ||  || — || September 6, 2007 || Dauban || Chante-Perdrix Obs. || LIX || align=right | 4.5 km || 
|-id=408 bgcolor=#d6d6d6
| 278408 ||  || — || September 3, 2007 || Catalina || CSS || — || align=right | 4.1 km || 
|-id=409 bgcolor=#d6d6d6
| 278409 ||  || — || September 5, 2007 || Catalina || CSS || — || align=right | 4.4 km || 
|-id=410 bgcolor=#d6d6d6
| 278410 ||  || — || September 8, 2007 || Anderson Mesa || LONEOS || — || align=right | 6.5 km || 
|-id=411 bgcolor=#d6d6d6
| 278411 ||  || — || September 9, 2007 || Kitt Peak || Spacewatch || ALA || align=right | 4.8 km || 
|-id=412 bgcolor=#E9E9E9
| 278412 ||  || — || September 9, 2007 || Kitt Peak || Spacewatch || HOF || align=right | 3.9 km || 
|-id=413 bgcolor=#d6d6d6
| 278413 ||  || — || September 9, 2007 || Mount Lemmon || Mount Lemmon Survey || THM || align=right | 2.9 km || 
|-id=414 bgcolor=#d6d6d6
| 278414 ||  || — || September 9, 2007 || Kitt Peak || Spacewatch || — || align=right | 3.7 km || 
|-id=415 bgcolor=#d6d6d6
| 278415 ||  || — || September 11, 2007 || Catalina || CSS || — || align=right | 3.9 km || 
|-id=416 bgcolor=#d6d6d6
| 278416 ||  || — || September 12, 2007 || Catalina || CSS || — || align=right | 3.7 km || 
|-id=417 bgcolor=#d6d6d6
| 278417 ||  || — || September 14, 2007 || Taunus || E. Schwab, R. Kling || EOS || align=right | 2.5 km || 
|-id=418 bgcolor=#d6d6d6
| 278418 ||  || — || September 10, 2007 || Mount Lemmon || Mount Lemmon Survey || HYG || align=right | 3.3 km || 
|-id=419 bgcolor=#d6d6d6
| 278419 ||  || — || September 11, 2007 || Mount Lemmon || Mount Lemmon Survey || KOR || align=right | 1.4 km || 
|-id=420 bgcolor=#d6d6d6
| 278420 ||  || — || September 10, 2007 || Kitt Peak || Spacewatch || EOS || align=right | 2.5 km || 
|-id=421 bgcolor=#d6d6d6
| 278421 ||  || — || September 9, 2007 || Kitt Peak || Spacewatch || HYG || align=right | 3.6 km || 
|-id=422 bgcolor=#d6d6d6
| 278422 ||  || — || September 10, 2007 || Kitt Peak || Spacewatch || EOS || align=right | 2.5 km || 
|-id=423 bgcolor=#d6d6d6
| 278423 ||  || — || September 11, 2007 || Kitt Peak || Spacewatch || — || align=right | 2.5 km || 
|-id=424 bgcolor=#d6d6d6
| 278424 ||  || — || September 13, 2007 || Mount Lemmon || Mount Lemmon Survey || — || align=right | 3.2 km || 
|-id=425 bgcolor=#d6d6d6
| 278425 ||  || — || September 14, 2007 || Mount Lemmon || Mount Lemmon Survey || THM || align=right | 2.9 km || 
|-id=426 bgcolor=#d6d6d6
| 278426 ||  || — || September 11, 2007 || Mount Lemmon || Mount Lemmon Survey || — || align=right | 3.8 km || 
|-id=427 bgcolor=#d6d6d6
| 278427 ||  || — || September 14, 2007 || Catalina || CSS || — || align=right | 4.3 km || 
|-id=428 bgcolor=#d6d6d6
| 278428 ||  || — || September 14, 2007 || Mount Lemmon || Mount Lemmon Survey || — || align=right | 5.0 km || 
|-id=429 bgcolor=#d6d6d6
| 278429 ||  || — || September 15, 2007 || Anderson Mesa || LONEOS || — || align=right | 4.7 km || 
|-id=430 bgcolor=#d6d6d6
| 278430 ||  || — || September 15, 2007 || Mount Lemmon || Mount Lemmon Survey || — || align=right | 4.4 km || 
|-id=431 bgcolor=#d6d6d6
| 278431 ||  || — || September 15, 2007 || Kitt Peak || Spacewatch || 628 || align=right | 3.1 km || 
|-id=432 bgcolor=#E9E9E9
| 278432 ||  || — || September 9, 2007 || Siding Spring || SSS || TIN || align=right | 1.7 km || 
|-id=433 bgcolor=#E9E9E9
| 278433 ||  || — || September 9, 2007 || Siding Spring || SSS || TIN || align=right | 2.8 km || 
|-id=434 bgcolor=#d6d6d6
| 278434 ||  || — || September 9, 2007 || Siding Spring || SSS || EUP || align=right | 5.9 km || 
|-id=435 bgcolor=#d6d6d6
| 278435 ||  || — || September 14, 2007 || Catalina || CSS || EOS || align=right | 2.9 km || 
|-id=436 bgcolor=#d6d6d6
| 278436 ||  || — || September 13, 2007 || Kitt Peak || Spacewatch || THM || align=right | 2.6 km || 
|-id=437 bgcolor=#d6d6d6
| 278437 ||  || — || September 12, 2007 || Anderson Mesa || LONEOS || THM || align=right | 3.3 km || 
|-id=438 bgcolor=#d6d6d6
| 278438 ||  || — || September 4, 2007 || Mount Lemmon || Mount Lemmon Survey || EOS || align=right | 2.3 km || 
|-id=439 bgcolor=#d6d6d6
| 278439 ||  || — || September 4, 2007 || Mount Lemmon || Mount Lemmon Survey || EOS || align=right | 2.2 km || 
|-id=440 bgcolor=#d6d6d6
| 278440 ||  || — || September 11, 2007 || Kitt Peak || Spacewatch || EOS || align=right | 2.2 km || 
|-id=441 bgcolor=#d6d6d6
| 278441 ||  || — || September 12, 2007 || Catalina || CSS || — || align=right | 4.2 km || 
|-id=442 bgcolor=#E9E9E9
| 278442 ||  || — || September 15, 2007 || Kitt Peak || Spacewatch || — || align=right | 1.8 km || 
|-id=443 bgcolor=#d6d6d6
| 278443 ||  || — || September 18, 2007 || Dauban || Chante-Perdrix Obs. || — || align=right | 4.0 km || 
|-id=444 bgcolor=#E9E9E9
| 278444 ||  || — || September 16, 2007 || Tiki || N. Teamo || DOR || align=right | 2.8 km || 
|-id=445 bgcolor=#d6d6d6
| 278445 ||  || — || September 18, 2007 || Anderson Mesa || LONEOS || EOS || align=right | 2.8 km || 
|-id=446 bgcolor=#d6d6d6
| 278446 ||  || — || September 30, 2007 || Kitt Peak || Spacewatch || 7:4 || align=right | 5.5 km || 
|-id=447 bgcolor=#d6d6d6
| 278447 Saviano ||  ||  || October 2, 2007 || Vallemare di Borbona || V. S. Casulli || 7:4 || align=right | 5.0 km || 
|-id=448 bgcolor=#d6d6d6
| 278448 ||  || — || October 3, 2007 || 7300 Observatory || W. K. Y. Yeung || — || align=right | 3.7 km || 
|-id=449 bgcolor=#FA8072
| 278449 ||  || — || October 6, 2007 || Socorro || LINEAR || H || align=right data-sort-value="0.72" | 720 m || 
|-id=450 bgcolor=#d6d6d6
| 278450 ||  || — || October 6, 2007 || La Sagra || OAM Obs. || TIR || align=right | 5.3 km || 
|-id=451 bgcolor=#d6d6d6
| 278451 ||  || — || October 9, 2007 || Goodricke-Pigott || R. A. Tucker || — || align=right | 6.2 km || 
|-id=452 bgcolor=#d6d6d6
| 278452 ||  || — || October 4, 2007 || Kitt Peak || Spacewatch || MEL || align=right | 4.1 km || 
|-id=453 bgcolor=#d6d6d6
| 278453 ||  || — || October 5, 2007 || Purple Mountain || PMO NEO || — || align=right | 4.3 km || 
|-id=454 bgcolor=#FA8072
| 278454 ||  || — || October 8, 2007 || Catalina || CSS || — || align=right data-sort-value="0.92" | 920 m || 
|-id=455 bgcolor=#E9E9E9
| 278455 ||  || — || October 8, 2007 || Mount Lemmon || Mount Lemmon Survey || — || align=right | 2.4 km || 
|-id=456 bgcolor=#d6d6d6
| 278456 ||  || — || October 7, 2007 || Catalina || CSS || HYG || align=right | 3.6 km || 
|-id=457 bgcolor=#d6d6d6
| 278457 ||  || — || October 8, 2007 || Catalina || CSS || — || align=right | 4.7 km || 
|-id=458 bgcolor=#d6d6d6
| 278458 ||  || — || October 8, 2007 || Catalina || CSS || — || align=right | 4.8 km || 
|-id=459 bgcolor=#d6d6d6
| 278459 ||  || — || October 6, 2007 || Kitt Peak || Spacewatch || — || align=right | 4.7 km || 
|-id=460 bgcolor=#d6d6d6
| 278460 ||  || — || October 6, 2007 || Kitt Peak || Spacewatch || — || align=right | 5.7 km || 
|-id=461 bgcolor=#d6d6d6
| 278461 ||  || — || October 9, 2007 || Kitt Peak || Spacewatch || — || align=right | 4.9 km || 
|-id=462 bgcolor=#FA8072
| 278462 ||  || — || October 9, 2007 || Socorro || LINEAR || — || align=right | 1.8 km || 
|-id=463 bgcolor=#d6d6d6
| 278463 ||  || — || October 11, 2007 || Socorro || LINEAR || EOS || align=right | 2.4 km || 
|-id=464 bgcolor=#fefefe
| 278464 ||  || — || October 11, 2007 || Socorro || LINEAR || NYS || align=right data-sort-value="0.74" | 740 m || 
|-id=465 bgcolor=#E9E9E9
| 278465 ||  || — || October 12, 2007 || Socorro || LINEAR || TIN || align=right | 1.2 km || 
|-id=466 bgcolor=#E9E9E9
| 278466 ||  || — || October 12, 2007 || Socorro || LINEAR || ADE || align=right | 3.9 km || 
|-id=467 bgcolor=#d6d6d6
| 278467 ||  || — || October 4, 2007 || Mount Lemmon || Mount Lemmon Survey || — || align=right | 3.7 km || 
|-id=468 bgcolor=#d6d6d6
| 278468 ||  || — || October 10, 2007 || Catalina || CSS || — || align=right | 7.4 km || 
|-id=469 bgcolor=#d6d6d6
| 278469 ||  || — || October 11, 2007 || Catalina || CSS || — || align=right | 4.6 km || 
|-id=470 bgcolor=#d6d6d6
| 278470 ||  || — || October 5, 2007 || Kitt Peak || Spacewatch || — || align=right | 2.9 km || 
|-id=471 bgcolor=#FA8072
| 278471 ||  || — || October 8, 2007 || Catalina || CSS || — || align=right | 2.3 km || 
|-id=472 bgcolor=#d6d6d6
| 278472 ||  || — || October 12, 2007 || Anderson Mesa || LONEOS || — || align=right | 5.0 km || 
|-id=473 bgcolor=#d6d6d6
| 278473 ||  || — || October 9, 2007 || Kitt Peak || Spacewatch || — || align=right | 4.0 km || 
|-id=474 bgcolor=#fefefe
| 278474 ||  || — || October 11, 2007 || Catalina || CSS || — || align=right | 1.4 km || 
|-id=475 bgcolor=#d6d6d6
| 278475 ||  || — || October 13, 2007 || Catalina || CSS || LUT || align=right | 4.8 km || 
|-id=476 bgcolor=#E9E9E9
| 278476 ||  || — || October 15, 2007 || Kitt Peak || Spacewatch || JUN || align=right | 1.6 km || 
|-id=477 bgcolor=#d6d6d6
| 278477 ||  || — || October 15, 2007 || Anderson Mesa || LONEOS || — || align=right | 4.1 km || 
|-id=478 bgcolor=#d6d6d6
| 278478 ||  || — || October 10, 2007 || Catalina || CSS || LIX || align=right | 4.1 km || 
|-id=479 bgcolor=#d6d6d6
| 278479 ||  || — || October 15, 2007 || Mount Lemmon || Mount Lemmon Survey || URS || align=right | 4.4 km || 
|-id=480 bgcolor=#d6d6d6
| 278480 ||  || — || October 17, 2007 || Mayhill || A. Lowe || EUP || align=right | 6.6 km || 
|-id=481 bgcolor=#d6d6d6
| 278481 ||  || — || October 19, 2007 || Catalina || CSS || — || align=right | 4.2 km || 
|-id=482 bgcolor=#d6d6d6
| 278482 ||  || — || June 21, 2006 || Catalina || CSS || — || align=right | 4.2 km || 
|-id=483 bgcolor=#E9E9E9
| 278483 ||  || — || October 30, 2007 || Catalina || CSS || — || align=right | 2.5 km || 
|-id=484 bgcolor=#fefefe
| 278484 ||  || — || October 30, 2007 || Kitt Peak || Spacewatch || — || align=right | 1.1 km || 
|-id=485 bgcolor=#d6d6d6
| 278485 ||  || — || October 30, 2007 || Mount Lemmon || Mount Lemmon Survey || — || align=right | 4.6 km || 
|-id=486 bgcolor=#d6d6d6
| 278486 ||  || — || October 19, 2007 || Catalina || CSS || — || align=right | 4.5 km || 
|-id=487 bgcolor=#E9E9E9
| 278487 ||  || — || November 2, 2007 || Mount Lemmon || Mount Lemmon Survey || PAE || align=right | 3.5 km || 
|-id=488 bgcolor=#d6d6d6
| 278488 ||  || — || November 3, 2007 || Kitt Peak || Spacewatch || — || align=right | 3.3 km || 
|-id=489 bgcolor=#d6d6d6
| 278489 ||  || — || November 3, 2007 || Socorro || LINEAR || — || align=right | 4.7 km || 
|-id=490 bgcolor=#d6d6d6
| 278490 ||  || — || November 4, 2007 || Mount Lemmon || Mount Lemmon Survey || VER || align=right | 4.8 km || 
|-id=491 bgcolor=#fefefe
| 278491 ||  || — || November 5, 2007 || Purple Mountain || PMO NEO || FLO || align=right data-sort-value="0.66" | 660 m || 
|-id=492 bgcolor=#fefefe
| 278492 ||  || — || November 12, 2007 || Catalina || CSS || — || align=right | 1.2 km || 
|-id=493 bgcolor=#d6d6d6
| 278493 ||  || — || November 12, 2007 || Mount Lemmon || Mount Lemmon Survey || — || align=right | 3.8 km || 
|-id=494 bgcolor=#d6d6d6
| 278494 ||  || — || November 13, 2007 || Mount Lemmon || Mount Lemmon Survey || — || align=right | 4.1 km || 
|-id=495 bgcolor=#d6d6d6
| 278495 ||  || — || November 7, 2007 || Kitt Peak || Spacewatch || — || align=right | 5.3 km || 
|-id=496 bgcolor=#E9E9E9
| 278496 ||  || — || November 18, 2007 || Socorro || LINEAR || — || align=right | 3.1 km || 
|-id=497 bgcolor=#fefefe
| 278497 ||  || — || November 18, 2007 || Mount Lemmon || Mount Lemmon Survey || V || align=right data-sort-value="0.94" | 940 m || 
|-id=498 bgcolor=#fefefe
| 278498 ||  || — || December 5, 2007 || Kitt Peak || Spacewatch || FLO || align=right data-sort-value="0.83" | 830 m || 
|-id=499 bgcolor=#fefefe
| 278499 ||  || — || December 17, 2007 || Kitt Peak || Spacewatch || — || align=right data-sort-value="0.90" | 900 m || 
|-id=500 bgcolor=#fefefe
| 278500 ||  || — || December 31, 2007 || Catalina || CSS || — || align=right | 2.8 km || 
|}

278501–278600 

|-bgcolor=#fefefe
| 278501 ||  || — || December 30, 2007 || Catalina || CSS || — || align=right | 1.2 km || 
|-id=502 bgcolor=#fefefe
| 278502 ||  || — || January 6, 2008 || La Sagra || OAM Obs. || H || align=right data-sort-value="0.98" | 980 m || 
|-id=503 bgcolor=#fefefe
| 278503 ||  || — || January 11, 2008 || Kitt Peak || Spacewatch || V || align=right | 1.0 km || 
|-id=504 bgcolor=#fefefe
| 278504 ||  || — || January 11, 2008 || Catalina || CSS || V || align=right data-sort-value="0.92" | 920 m || 
|-id=505 bgcolor=#fefefe
| 278505 ||  || — || September 17, 1995 || Kitt Peak || Spacewatch || MAS || align=right data-sort-value="0.96" | 960 m || 
|-id=506 bgcolor=#fefefe
| 278506 ||  || — || January 30, 2008 || Catalina || CSS || NYS || align=right data-sort-value="0.90" | 900 m || 
|-id=507 bgcolor=#fefefe
| 278507 ||  || — || January 30, 2008 || Mount Lemmon || Mount Lemmon Survey || MAS || align=right data-sort-value="0.92" | 920 m || 
|-id=508 bgcolor=#E9E9E9
| 278508 ||  || — || February 3, 2008 || Bisei SG Center || BATTeRS || — || align=right | 1.3 km || 
|-id=509 bgcolor=#E9E9E9
| 278509 ||  || — || February 3, 2008 || Kitt Peak || Spacewatch || — || align=right | 1.3 km || 
|-id=510 bgcolor=#d6d6d6
| 278510 ||  || — || February 3, 2008 || Kitt Peak || Spacewatch || — || align=right | 2.9 km || 
|-id=511 bgcolor=#E9E9E9
| 278511 ||  || — || February 1, 2008 || Kitt Peak || Spacewatch || — || align=right | 1.3 km || 
|-id=512 bgcolor=#fefefe
| 278512 ||  || — || February 2, 2008 || Mount Lemmon || Mount Lemmon Survey || V || align=right data-sort-value="0.86" | 860 m || 
|-id=513 bgcolor=#fefefe
| 278513 Schwope ||  ||  || February 14, 2008 || Inastars || B. Thinius || — || align=right | 2.4 km || 
|-id=514 bgcolor=#E9E9E9
| 278514 ||  || — || February 9, 2008 || Catalina || CSS || — || align=right | 2.0 km || 
|-id=515 bgcolor=#fefefe
| 278515 ||  || — || February 13, 2008 || Mount Lemmon || Mount Lemmon Survey || — || align=right data-sort-value="0.95" | 950 m || 
|-id=516 bgcolor=#E9E9E9
| 278516 ||  || — || February 28, 2008 || Catalina || CSS || ADE || align=right | 3.2 km || 
|-id=517 bgcolor=#E9E9E9
| 278517 ||  || — || February 29, 2008 || Purple Mountain || PMO NEO || — || align=right | 2.2 km || 
|-id=518 bgcolor=#d6d6d6
| 278518 ||  || — || February 27, 2008 || Kitt Peak || Spacewatch || — || align=right | 3.4 km || 
|-id=519 bgcolor=#d6d6d6
| 278519 ||  || — || February 27, 2008 || Kitt Peak || Spacewatch || EMA || align=right | 3.3 km || 
|-id=520 bgcolor=#E9E9E9
| 278520 ||  || — || February 27, 2008 || Kitt Peak || Spacewatch || AGN || align=right | 1.4 km || 
|-id=521 bgcolor=#E9E9E9
| 278521 ||  || — || February 27, 2008 || Mount Lemmon || Mount Lemmon Survey || — || align=right | 2.2 km || 
|-id=522 bgcolor=#fefefe
| 278522 ||  || — || February 28, 2008 || Kitt Peak || Spacewatch || — || align=right data-sort-value="0.72" | 720 m || 
|-id=523 bgcolor=#fefefe
| 278523 ||  || — || February 28, 2008 || Kitt Peak || Spacewatch || — || align=right | 1.0 km || 
|-id=524 bgcolor=#E9E9E9
| 278524 ||  || — || February 29, 2008 || Catalina || CSS || MAR || align=right | 1.6 km || 
|-id=525 bgcolor=#fefefe
| 278525 ||  || — || February 29, 2008 || Kitt Peak || Spacewatch || — || align=right data-sort-value="0.71" | 710 m || 
|-id=526 bgcolor=#fefefe
| 278526 ||  || — || February 29, 2008 || Kitt Peak || Spacewatch || FLO || align=right data-sort-value="0.55" | 550 m || 
|-id=527 bgcolor=#E9E9E9
| 278527 ||  || — || February 18, 2008 || Mount Lemmon || Mount Lemmon Survey || — || align=right | 2.8 km || 
|-id=528 bgcolor=#E9E9E9
| 278528 ||  || — || March 1, 2008 || Kitt Peak || Spacewatch || PAD || align=right | 1.9 km || 
|-id=529 bgcolor=#fefefe
| 278529 ||  || — || March 1, 2008 || Kitt Peak || Spacewatch || — || align=right data-sort-value="0.66" | 660 m || 
|-id=530 bgcolor=#fefefe
| 278530 ||  || — || March 2, 2008 || Kitt Peak || Spacewatch || — || align=right | 1.1 km || 
|-id=531 bgcolor=#E9E9E9
| 278531 ||  || — || March 8, 2008 || Grove Creek || F. Tozzi || GEF || align=right | 2.0 km || 
|-id=532 bgcolor=#fefefe
| 278532 ||  || — || March 5, 2008 || Kitt Peak || Spacewatch || H || align=right data-sort-value="0.79" | 790 m || 
|-id=533 bgcolor=#fefefe
| 278533 ||  || — || March 5, 2008 || Mount Lemmon || Mount Lemmon Survey || — || align=right | 1.0 km || 
|-id=534 bgcolor=#d6d6d6
| 278534 ||  || — || March 4, 2008 || Mount Lemmon || Mount Lemmon Survey || — || align=right | 4.0 km || 
|-id=535 bgcolor=#d6d6d6
| 278535 ||  || — || March 6, 2008 || Mount Lemmon || Mount Lemmon Survey || — || align=right | 3.2 km || 
|-id=536 bgcolor=#fefefe
| 278536 ||  || — || March 7, 2008 || Kitt Peak || Spacewatch || — || align=right data-sort-value="0.97" | 970 m || 
|-id=537 bgcolor=#E9E9E9
| 278537 ||  || — || March 7, 2008 || Kitt Peak || Spacewatch || — || align=right | 2.3 km || 
|-id=538 bgcolor=#fefefe
| 278538 ||  || — || March 4, 2008 || Socorro || LINEAR || — || align=right data-sort-value="0.90" | 900 m || 
|-id=539 bgcolor=#E9E9E9
| 278539 ||  || — || March 8, 2008 || Socorro || LINEAR || — || align=right | 1.5 km || 
|-id=540 bgcolor=#d6d6d6
| 278540 ||  || — || March 10, 2008 || Mount Lemmon || Mount Lemmon Survey || — || align=right | 5.9 km || 
|-id=541 bgcolor=#fefefe
| 278541 ||  || — || March 9, 2008 || Kitt Peak || Spacewatch || NYS || align=right data-sort-value="0.75" | 750 m || 
|-id=542 bgcolor=#E9E9E9
| 278542 ||  || — || March 10, 2008 || Kitt Peak || Spacewatch || — || align=right | 2.8 km || 
|-id=543 bgcolor=#fefefe
| 278543 ||  || — || March 2, 2008 || Kitt Peak || Spacewatch || — || align=right data-sort-value="0.81" | 810 m || 
|-id=544 bgcolor=#fefefe
| 278544 ||  || — || March 6, 2008 || Mount Lemmon || Mount Lemmon Survey || FLO || align=right data-sort-value="0.73" | 730 m || 
|-id=545 bgcolor=#d6d6d6
| 278545 ||  || — || March 8, 2008 || Socorro || LINEAR || — || align=right | 6.0 km || 
|-id=546 bgcolor=#E9E9E9
| 278546 ||  || — || March 25, 2008 || Kitt Peak || Spacewatch || — || align=right | 2.8 km || 
|-id=547 bgcolor=#E9E9E9
| 278547 ||  || — || March 25, 2008 || Kitt Peak || Spacewatch || — || align=right | 1.4 km || 
|-id=548 bgcolor=#fefefe
| 278548 ||  || — || March 27, 2008 || Kitt Peak || Spacewatch || V || align=right data-sort-value="0.87" | 870 m || 
|-id=549 bgcolor=#fefefe
| 278549 ||  || — || March 28, 2008 || Mount Lemmon || Mount Lemmon Survey || — || align=right data-sort-value="0.79" | 790 m || 
|-id=550 bgcolor=#fefefe
| 278550 ||  || — || March 28, 2008 || Mount Lemmon || Mount Lemmon Survey || MAS || align=right data-sort-value="0.87" | 870 m || 
|-id=551 bgcolor=#d6d6d6
| 278551 ||  || — || March 28, 2008 || Mount Lemmon || Mount Lemmon Survey || — || align=right | 4.5 km || 
|-id=552 bgcolor=#d6d6d6
| 278552 ||  || — || March 28, 2008 || Kitt Peak || Spacewatch || EOS || align=right | 2.9 km || 
|-id=553 bgcolor=#fefefe
| 278553 ||  || — || March 29, 2008 || Kitt Peak || Spacewatch || NYS || align=right data-sort-value="0.80" | 800 m || 
|-id=554 bgcolor=#fefefe
| 278554 ||  || — || March 31, 2008 || Mount Lemmon || Mount Lemmon Survey || NYS || align=right data-sort-value="0.81" | 810 m || 
|-id=555 bgcolor=#fefefe
| 278555 ||  || — || March 28, 2008 || Mount Lemmon || Mount Lemmon Survey || V || align=right data-sort-value="0.68" | 680 m || 
|-id=556 bgcolor=#fefefe
| 278556 ||  || — || March 31, 2008 || Mount Lemmon || Mount Lemmon Survey || — || align=right data-sort-value="0.73" | 730 m || 
|-id=557 bgcolor=#d6d6d6
| 278557 ||  || — || April 3, 2008 || Kitt Peak || Spacewatch || EOS || align=right | 2.3 km || 
|-id=558 bgcolor=#d6d6d6
| 278558 ||  || — || April 3, 2008 || Kitt Peak || Spacewatch || EOS || align=right | 2.5 km || 
|-id=559 bgcolor=#E9E9E9
| 278559 ||  || — || April 3, 2008 || Kitt Peak || Spacewatch || — || align=right | 3.2 km || 
|-id=560 bgcolor=#E9E9E9
| 278560 ||  || — || April 4, 2008 || Kitt Peak || Spacewatch || RAF || align=right | 1.0 km || 
|-id=561 bgcolor=#fefefe
| 278561 ||  || — || April 7, 2008 || Kitt Peak || Spacewatch || — || align=right data-sort-value="0.83" | 830 m || 
|-id=562 bgcolor=#d6d6d6
| 278562 ||  || — || April 7, 2008 || Kitt Peak || Spacewatch || TEL || align=right | 1.3 km || 
|-id=563 bgcolor=#E9E9E9
| 278563 ||  || — || April 6, 2008 || Catalina || CSS || GEF || align=right | 1.7 km || 
|-id=564 bgcolor=#fefefe
| 278564 ||  || — || April 8, 2008 || Kitt Peak || Spacewatch || — || align=right data-sort-value="0.82" | 820 m || 
|-id=565 bgcolor=#fefefe
| 278565 ||  || — || April 14, 2008 || Mount Lemmon || Mount Lemmon Survey || V || align=right data-sort-value="0.86" | 860 m || 
|-id=566 bgcolor=#E9E9E9
| 278566 ||  || — || April 14, 2008 || Mount Lemmon || Mount Lemmon Survey || — || align=right | 1.2 km || 
|-id=567 bgcolor=#fefefe
| 278567 ||  || — || April 3, 2008 || Mount Lemmon || Mount Lemmon Survey || FLO || align=right data-sort-value="0.82" | 820 m || 
|-id=568 bgcolor=#fefefe
| 278568 ||  || — || April 10, 2008 || Kitt Peak || Spacewatch || — || align=right data-sort-value="0.85" | 850 m || 
|-id=569 bgcolor=#fefefe
| 278569 ||  || — || April 5, 2008 || Kitt Peak || Spacewatch || FLO || align=right data-sort-value="0.62" | 620 m || 
|-id=570 bgcolor=#d6d6d6
| 278570 ||  || — || April 24, 2008 || Kitt Peak || Spacewatch || — || align=right | 3.4 km || 
|-id=571 bgcolor=#d6d6d6
| 278571 ||  || — || April 24, 2008 || Kitt Peak || Spacewatch || EOS || align=right | 2.7 km || 
|-id=572 bgcolor=#C2FFFF
| 278572 ||  || — || April 26, 2008 || Kitt Peak || Spacewatch || L5 || align=right | 10 km || 
|-id=573 bgcolor=#fefefe
| 278573 ||  || — || April 27, 2008 || Kitt Peak || Spacewatch || — || align=right data-sort-value="0.87" | 870 m || 
|-id=574 bgcolor=#d6d6d6
| 278574 ||  || — || April 27, 2008 || Mount Lemmon || Mount Lemmon Survey || — || align=right | 2.9 km || 
|-id=575 bgcolor=#fefefe
| 278575 ||  || — || April 29, 2008 || Mount Lemmon || Mount Lemmon Survey || — || align=right | 1.1 km || 
|-id=576 bgcolor=#FA8072
| 278576 ||  || — || April 30, 2008 || La Sagra || OAM Obs. || — || align=right data-sort-value="0.75" | 750 m || 
|-id=577 bgcolor=#fefefe
| 278577 ||  || — || April 26, 2008 || Mount Lemmon || Mount Lemmon Survey || MAS || align=right data-sort-value="0.66" | 660 m || 
|-id=578 bgcolor=#E9E9E9
| 278578 ||  || — || April 30, 2008 || Kitt Peak || Spacewatch || — || align=right | 1.2 km || 
|-id=579 bgcolor=#E9E9E9
| 278579 ||  || — || April 28, 2008 || Reedy Creek || J. Broughton || — || align=right | 2.1 km || 
|-id=580 bgcolor=#d6d6d6
| 278580 ||  || — || May 3, 2008 || Kitt Peak || Spacewatch || — || align=right | 3.4 km || 
|-id=581 bgcolor=#d6d6d6
| 278581 ||  || — || May 2, 2008 || Kitt Peak || Spacewatch || EOS || align=right | 2.2 km || 
|-id=582 bgcolor=#fefefe
| 278582 ||  || — || May 5, 2008 || Jarnac || Jarnac Obs. || — || align=right | 1.1 km || 
|-id=583 bgcolor=#d6d6d6
| 278583 ||  || — || May 7, 2008 || Kitt Peak || Spacewatch || — || align=right | 3.9 km || 
|-id=584 bgcolor=#fefefe
| 278584 ||  || — || May 8, 2008 || Kitt Peak || Spacewatch || — || align=right data-sort-value="0.75" | 750 m || 
|-id=585 bgcolor=#E9E9E9
| 278585 ||  || — || May 29, 2008 || Kitt Peak || Spacewatch || — || align=right | 2.3 km || 
|-id=586 bgcolor=#fefefe
| 278586 ||  || — || May 27, 2008 || Kitt Peak || Spacewatch || — || align=right data-sort-value="0.91" | 910 m || 
|-id=587 bgcolor=#fefefe
| 278587 ||  || — || May 30, 2008 || Mount Lemmon || Mount Lemmon Survey || V || align=right data-sort-value="0.73" | 730 m || 
|-id=588 bgcolor=#fefefe
| 278588 ||  || — || June 8, 2008 || Cerro Burek || Alianza S4 Obs. || V || align=right data-sort-value="0.76" | 760 m || 
|-id=589 bgcolor=#fefefe
| 278589 ||  || — || July 1, 2008 || Kitt Peak || Spacewatch || — || align=right | 1.3 km || 
|-id=590 bgcolor=#fefefe
| 278590 ||  || — || July 4, 2008 || La Sagra || OAM Obs. || FLO || align=right data-sort-value="0.70" | 700 m || 
|-id=591 bgcolor=#fefefe
| 278591 Salò ||  ||  || July 15, 2008 || Magasa || M. Tonincelli, A. Stucchi || V || align=right data-sort-value="0.85" | 850 m || 
|-id=592 bgcolor=#FA8072
| 278592 ||  || — || July 3, 2008 || Siding Spring || SSS || — || align=right | 1.3 km || 
|-id=593 bgcolor=#E9E9E9
| 278593 ||  || — || July 24, 2008 || La Sagra || OAM Obs. || ADE || align=right | 2.7 km || 
|-id=594 bgcolor=#fefefe
| 278594 ||  || — || July 26, 2008 || La Sagra || OAM Obs. || FLO || align=right data-sort-value="0.85" | 850 m || 
|-id=595 bgcolor=#E9E9E9
| 278595 ||  || — || July 27, 2008 || Skylive Obs. || F. Tozzi || JUN || align=right | 1.4 km || 
|-id=596 bgcolor=#fefefe
| 278596 ||  || — || July 27, 2008 || La Sagra || OAM Obs. || — || align=right data-sort-value="0.99" | 990 m || 
|-id=597 bgcolor=#d6d6d6
| 278597 ||  || — || July 29, 2008 || Kitt Peak || Spacewatch || EOS || align=right | 2.0 km || 
|-id=598 bgcolor=#E9E9E9
| 278598 ||  || — || July 30, 2008 || Kitt Peak || Spacewatch || — || align=right | 2.8 km || 
|-id=599 bgcolor=#E9E9E9
| 278599 ||  || — || July 29, 2008 || Mount Lemmon || Mount Lemmon Survey || — || align=right | 1.7 km || 
|-id=600 bgcolor=#fefefe
| 278600 ||  || — || July 28, 2008 || Siding Spring || SSS || — || align=right data-sort-value="0.95" | 950 m || 
|}

278601–278700 

|-bgcolor=#fefefe
| 278601 ||  || — || August 2, 2008 || Reedy Creek || J. Broughton || — || align=right | 1.5 km || 
|-id=602 bgcolor=#fefefe
| 278602 ||  || — || August 4, 2008 || La Sagra || OAM Obs. || MAS || align=right | 1.1 km || 
|-id=603 bgcolor=#fefefe
| 278603 ||  || — || August 4, 2008 || La Sagra || OAM Obs. || — || align=right | 1.1 km || 
|-id=604 bgcolor=#d6d6d6
| 278604 ||  || — || August 5, 2008 || Tiki || N. Teamo || — || align=right | 3.5 km || 
|-id=605 bgcolor=#fefefe
| 278605 ||  || — || August 5, 2008 || La Sagra || OAM Obs. || FLO || align=right data-sort-value="0.73" | 730 m || 
|-id=606 bgcolor=#fefefe
| 278606 ||  || — || August 7, 2008 || Hibiscus || S. F. Hönig, N. Teamo || — || align=right data-sort-value="0.91" | 910 m || 
|-id=607 bgcolor=#d6d6d6
| 278607 ||  || — || August 9, 2008 || Reedy Creek || J. Broughton || TIR || align=right | 3.3 km || 
|-id=608 bgcolor=#E9E9E9
| 278608 ||  || — || August 8, 2008 || Reedy Creek || J. Broughton || — || align=right | 1.7 km || 
|-id=609 bgcolor=#fefefe
| 278609 Avrudenko ||  ||  || August 5, 2008 || Andrushivka || Andrushivka Obs. || — || align=right data-sort-value="0.78" | 780 m || 
|-id=610 bgcolor=#d6d6d6
| 278610 ||  || — || August 7, 2008 || Kitt Peak || Spacewatch || — || align=right | 4.3 km || 
|-id=611 bgcolor=#fefefe
| 278611 ||  || — || August 22, 2008 || Kitt Peak || Spacewatch || — || align=right data-sort-value="0.90" | 900 m || 
|-id=612 bgcolor=#d6d6d6
| 278612 ||  || — || August 22, 2008 || Kitt Peak || Spacewatch || TIR || align=right | 4.0 km || 
|-id=613 bgcolor=#fefefe
| 278613 ||  || — || August 24, 2008 || La Sagra || OAM Obs. || — || align=right | 3.3 km || 
|-id=614 bgcolor=#fefefe
| 278614 ||  || — || August 25, 2008 || La Sagra || OAM Obs. || NYS || align=right data-sort-value="0.60" | 600 m || 
|-id=615 bgcolor=#fefefe
| 278615 ||  || — || August 25, 2008 || La Sagra || OAM Obs. || — || align=right | 1.2 km || 
|-id=616 bgcolor=#E9E9E9
| 278616 ||  || — || August 25, 2008 || La Sagra || OAM Obs. || — || align=right | 3.3 km || 
|-id=617 bgcolor=#d6d6d6
| 278617 ||  || — || August 26, 2008 || La Sagra || OAM Obs. || — || align=right | 4.2 km || 
|-id=618 bgcolor=#fefefe
| 278618 ||  || — || August 26, 2008 || La Sagra || OAM Obs. || — || align=right | 1.0 km || 
|-id=619 bgcolor=#fefefe
| 278619 ||  || — || August 21, 2008 || Kitt Peak || Spacewatch || — || align=right data-sort-value="0.78" | 780 m || 
|-id=620 bgcolor=#d6d6d6
| 278620 ||  || — || August 31, 2008 || Great Shefford || P. Birtwhistle || — || align=right | 3.9 km || 
|-id=621 bgcolor=#d6d6d6
| 278621 ||  || — || August 26, 2008 || Socorro || LINEAR || ALA || align=right | 3.8 km || 
|-id=622 bgcolor=#E9E9E9
| 278622 ||  || — || August 31, 2008 || Tiki || N. Teamo || DOR || align=right | 3.2 km || 
|-id=623 bgcolor=#fefefe
| 278623 ||  || — || August 31, 2008 || La Sagra || OAM Obs. || NYS || align=right data-sort-value="0.81" | 810 m || 
|-id=624 bgcolor=#fefefe
| 278624 ||  || — || August 30, 2008 || Socorro || LINEAR || — || align=right | 1.3 km || 
|-id=625 bgcolor=#E9E9E9
| 278625 ||  || — || August 27, 2008 || Pises || Pises Obs. || — || align=right | 2.1 km || 
|-id=626 bgcolor=#E9E9E9
| 278626 ||  || — || August 31, 2008 || Moletai || Molėtai Obs. || PAD || align=right | 2.2 km || 
|-id=627 bgcolor=#E9E9E9
| 278627 ||  || — || August 24, 2008 || Kitt Peak || Spacewatch || — || align=right | 2.3 km || 
|-id=628 bgcolor=#fefefe
| 278628 ||  || — || August 20, 2008 || Kitt Peak || Spacewatch || — || align=right data-sort-value="0.94" | 940 m || 
|-id=629 bgcolor=#E9E9E9
| 278629 ||  || — || August 21, 2008 || Kitt Peak || Spacewatch || — || align=right | 2.1 km || 
|-id=630 bgcolor=#d6d6d6
| 278630 ||  || — || August 24, 2008 || Socorro || LINEAR || EOS || align=right | 3.0 km || 
|-id=631 bgcolor=#fefefe
| 278631 ||  || — || August 23, 2008 || Socorro || LINEAR || — || align=right | 1.2 km || 
|-id=632 bgcolor=#E9E9E9
| 278632 ||  || — || August 23, 2008 || Kitt Peak || Spacewatch || WIT || align=right | 1.3 km || 
|-id=633 bgcolor=#d6d6d6
| 278633 ||  || — || August 23, 2008 || Kitt Peak || Spacewatch || — || align=right | 4.1 km || 
|-id=634 bgcolor=#E9E9E9
| 278634 ||  || — || September 1, 2008 || Hibiscus || S. F. Hönig, N. Teamo || ADE || align=right | 3.6 km || 
|-id=635 bgcolor=#FA8072
| 278635 ||  || — || September 3, 2008 || Kachina || J. Hobart || — || align=right | 1.0 km || 
|-id=636 bgcolor=#d6d6d6
| 278636 ||  || — || September 2, 2008 || Kitt Peak || Spacewatch || THM || align=right | 2.6 km || 
|-id=637 bgcolor=#E9E9E9
| 278637 ||  || — || September 2, 2008 || Kitt Peak || Spacewatch || — || align=right | 2.7 km || 
|-id=638 bgcolor=#E9E9E9
| 278638 ||  || — || September 2, 2008 || Kitt Peak || Spacewatch || — || align=right | 2.2 km || 
|-id=639 bgcolor=#E9E9E9
| 278639 ||  || — || September 2, 2008 || Kitt Peak || Spacewatch || WIT || align=right | 1.5 km || 
|-id=640 bgcolor=#d6d6d6
| 278640 ||  || — || September 2, 2008 || Moletai || Molėtai Obs. || — || align=right | 3.4 km || 
|-id=641 bgcolor=#d6d6d6
| 278641 ||  || — || September 4, 2008 || Kitt Peak || Spacewatch || 628 || align=right | 2.4 km || 
|-id=642 bgcolor=#d6d6d6
| 278642 ||  || — || September 4, 2008 || Kitt Peak || Spacewatch || NAE || align=right | 3.7 km || 
|-id=643 bgcolor=#E9E9E9
| 278643 ||  || — || September 4, 2008 || Kitt Peak || Spacewatch || — || align=right | 1.8 km || 
|-id=644 bgcolor=#fefefe
| 278644 ||  || — || September 4, 2008 || Kitt Peak || Spacewatch || ERI || align=right | 1.5 km || 
|-id=645 bgcolor=#fefefe
| 278645 Kontsevych ||  ||  || September 4, 2008 || Andrushivka || Andrushivka Obs. || MAS || align=right | 1.0 km || 
|-id=646 bgcolor=#fefefe
| 278646 ||  || — || September 5, 2008 || Socorro || LINEAR || — || align=right | 1.4 km || 
|-id=647 bgcolor=#d6d6d6
| 278647 ||  || — || September 2, 2008 || Kitt Peak || Spacewatch || KOR || align=right | 1.4 km || 
|-id=648 bgcolor=#E9E9E9
| 278648 ||  || — || September 2, 2008 || Kitt Peak || Spacewatch || — || align=right | 1.3 km || 
|-id=649 bgcolor=#d6d6d6
| 278649 ||  || — || September 2, 2008 || Kitt Peak || Spacewatch || — || align=right | 3.4 km || 
|-id=650 bgcolor=#d6d6d6
| 278650 ||  || — || September 2, 2008 || Kitt Peak || Spacewatch || KOR || align=right | 1.6 km || 
|-id=651 bgcolor=#d6d6d6
| 278651 ||  || — || September 2, 2008 || Kitt Peak || Spacewatch || — || align=right | 2.8 km || 
|-id=652 bgcolor=#E9E9E9
| 278652 ||  || — || September 2, 2008 || Kitt Peak || Spacewatch || — || align=right | 1.8 km || 
|-id=653 bgcolor=#E9E9E9
| 278653 ||  || — || September 2, 2008 || Kitt Peak || Spacewatch || — || align=right | 2.0 km || 
|-id=654 bgcolor=#E9E9E9
| 278654 ||  || — || September 2, 2008 || Kitt Peak || Spacewatch || — || align=right | 2.4 km || 
|-id=655 bgcolor=#d6d6d6
| 278655 ||  || — || September 2, 2008 || Kitt Peak || Spacewatch || — || align=right | 2.9 km || 
|-id=656 bgcolor=#d6d6d6
| 278656 ||  || — || September 2, 2008 || Kitt Peak || Spacewatch || KOR || align=right | 1.6 km || 
|-id=657 bgcolor=#E9E9E9
| 278657 ||  || — || September 3, 2008 || Kitt Peak || Spacewatch || PAD || align=right | 2.1 km || 
|-id=658 bgcolor=#d6d6d6
| 278658 ||  || — || September 3, 2008 || Kitt Peak || Spacewatch || EOS || align=right | 2.4 km || 
|-id=659 bgcolor=#E9E9E9
| 278659 ||  || — || September 4, 2008 || Kitt Peak || Spacewatch || — || align=right | 1.6 km || 
|-id=660 bgcolor=#fefefe
| 278660 ||  || — || September 4, 2008 || Kitt Peak || Spacewatch || — || align=right data-sort-value="0.70" | 700 m || 
|-id=661 bgcolor=#E9E9E9
| 278661 ||  || — || September 4, 2008 || Kitt Peak || Spacewatch || — || align=right | 1.5 km || 
|-id=662 bgcolor=#E9E9E9
| 278662 ||  || — || September 4, 2008 || Kitt Peak || Spacewatch || — || align=right | 4.4 km || 
|-id=663 bgcolor=#fefefe
| 278663 ||  || — || September 4, 2008 || Kitt Peak || Spacewatch || NYS || align=right data-sort-value="0.88" | 880 m || 
|-id=664 bgcolor=#E9E9E9
| 278664 ||  || — || September 6, 2008 || Catalina || CSS || — || align=right | 1.2 km || 
|-id=665 bgcolor=#d6d6d6
| 278665 ||  || — || September 9, 2008 || Bergisch Gladbac || W. Bickel || — || align=right | 3.1 km || 
|-id=666 bgcolor=#d6d6d6
| 278666 ||  || — || September 5, 2008 || Kitt Peak || Spacewatch || EOS || align=right | 2.4 km || 
|-id=667 bgcolor=#E9E9E9
| 278667 ||  || — || September 5, 2008 || Kitt Peak || Spacewatch || DOR || align=right | 2.0 km || 
|-id=668 bgcolor=#d6d6d6
| 278668 ||  || — || September 5, 2008 || Kitt Peak || Spacewatch || 3:2 || align=right | 7.1 km || 
|-id=669 bgcolor=#E9E9E9
| 278669 ||  || — || September 6, 2008 || Mount Lemmon || Mount Lemmon Survey || — || align=right | 1.8 km || 
|-id=670 bgcolor=#E9E9E9
| 278670 ||  || — || September 6, 2008 || Kitt Peak || Spacewatch || — || align=right | 2.1 km || 
|-id=671 bgcolor=#E9E9E9
| 278671 ||  || — || September 6, 2008 || Kitt Peak || Spacewatch || — || align=right | 1.2 km || 
|-id=672 bgcolor=#E9E9E9
| 278672 ||  || — || September 6, 2008 || Kitt Peak || Spacewatch || — || align=right | 2.1 km || 
|-id=673 bgcolor=#d6d6d6
| 278673 ||  || — || September 6, 2008 || Kitt Peak || Spacewatch || — || align=right | 2.8 km || 
|-id=674 bgcolor=#E9E9E9
| 278674 ||  || — || September 6, 2008 || Kitt Peak || Spacewatch || — || align=right | 1.5 km || 
|-id=675 bgcolor=#fefefe
| 278675 ||  || — || September 7, 2008 || Catalina || CSS || — || align=right data-sort-value="0.91" | 910 m || 
|-id=676 bgcolor=#d6d6d6
| 278676 ||  || — || September 7, 2008 || Mount Lemmon || Mount Lemmon Survey || TEL || align=right | 3.5 km || 
|-id=677 bgcolor=#E9E9E9
| 278677 ||  || — || September 2, 2008 || Kitt Peak || Spacewatch || — || align=right | 2.1 km || 
|-id=678 bgcolor=#E9E9E9
| 278678 ||  || — || September 4, 2008 || Kitt Peak || Spacewatch || HEN || align=right | 1.5 km || 
|-id=679 bgcolor=#d6d6d6
| 278679 ||  || — || September 6, 2008 || Mount Lemmon || Mount Lemmon Survey || — || align=right | 2.9 km || 
|-id=680 bgcolor=#d6d6d6
| 278680 ||  || — || September 7, 2008 || Mount Lemmon || Mount Lemmon Survey || — || align=right | 2.9 km || 
|-id=681 bgcolor=#d6d6d6
| 278681 ||  || — || September 7, 2008 || Catalina || CSS || TIR || align=right | 4.2 km || 
|-id=682 bgcolor=#E9E9E9
| 278682 ||  || — || September 8, 2008 || Kitt Peak || Spacewatch || — || align=right | 1.6 km || 
|-id=683 bgcolor=#fefefe
| 278683 ||  || — || September 3, 2008 || Kitt Peak || Spacewatch || — || align=right | 1.1 km || 
|-id=684 bgcolor=#E9E9E9
| 278684 ||  || — || September 4, 2008 || Kitt Peak || Spacewatch || EUN || align=right | 1.4 km || 
|-id=685 bgcolor=#E9E9E9
| 278685 ||  || — || September 7, 2008 || Mount Lemmon || Mount Lemmon Survey || — || align=right | 1.9 km || 
|-id=686 bgcolor=#d6d6d6
| 278686 ||  || — || September 7, 2008 || Mount Lemmon || Mount Lemmon Survey || KOR || align=right | 1.5 km || 
|-id=687 bgcolor=#E9E9E9
| 278687 ||  || — || September 7, 2008 || Catalina || CSS || — || align=right | 1.2 km || 
|-id=688 bgcolor=#E9E9E9
| 278688 ||  || — || September 9, 2008 || Mount Lemmon || Mount Lemmon Survey || — || align=right | 2.6 km || 
|-id=689 bgcolor=#d6d6d6
| 278689 ||  || — || September 9, 2008 || Kitt Peak || Spacewatch || — || align=right | 3.2 km || 
|-id=690 bgcolor=#E9E9E9
| 278690 ||  || — || September 12, 2008 || Piszkéstető || K. Sárneczky || — || align=right | 1.1 km || 
|-id=691 bgcolor=#d6d6d6
| 278691 ||  || — || September 6, 2008 || Kitt Peak || Spacewatch || — || align=right | 4.5 km || 
|-id=692 bgcolor=#E9E9E9
| 278692 ||  || — || September 5, 2008 || La Sagra || OAM Obs. || — || align=right | 2.2 km || 
|-id=693 bgcolor=#E9E9E9
| 278693 ||  || — || September 2, 2008 || Kitt Peak || Spacewatch || WIT || align=right | 1.1 km || 
|-id=694 bgcolor=#E9E9E9
| 278694 ||  || — || September 6, 2008 || Siding Spring || SSS || — || align=right | 2.2 km || 
|-id=695 bgcolor=#d6d6d6
| 278695 ||  || — || September 7, 2008 || Mount Lemmon || Mount Lemmon Survey || — || align=right | 2.8 km || 
|-id=696 bgcolor=#d6d6d6
| 278696 ||  || — || September 4, 2008 || La Sagra || OAM Obs. || — || align=right | 4.9 km || 
|-id=697 bgcolor=#d6d6d6
| 278697 ||  || — || September 4, 2008 || Socorro || LINEAR || — || align=right | 3.9 km || 
|-id=698 bgcolor=#E9E9E9
| 278698 ||  || — || September 7, 2008 || Socorro || LINEAR || — || align=right | 3.0 km || 
|-id=699 bgcolor=#E9E9E9
| 278699 ||  || — || September 7, 2008 || Mount Lemmon || Mount Lemmon Survey || — || align=right | 4.1 km || 
|-id=700 bgcolor=#E9E9E9
| 278700 ||  || — || September 7, 2008 || Mount Lemmon || Mount Lemmon Survey || KON || align=right | 3.5 km || 
|}

278701–278800 

|-bgcolor=#E9E9E9
| 278701 ||  || — || September 4, 2008 || Socorro || LINEAR || WIT || align=right | 1.3 km || 
|-id=702 bgcolor=#fefefe
| 278702 ||  || — || September 3, 2008 || Kitt Peak || Spacewatch || NYS || align=right data-sort-value="0.73" | 730 m || 
|-id=703 bgcolor=#fefefe
| 278703 ||  || — || September 6, 2008 || Kitt Peak || Spacewatch || MAS || align=right data-sort-value="0.68" | 680 m || 
|-id=704 bgcolor=#E9E9E9
| 278704 ||  || — || September 22, 2008 || Socorro || LINEAR || — || align=right | 2.7 km || 
|-id=705 bgcolor=#d6d6d6
| 278705 ||  || — || September 19, 2008 || Kitt Peak || Spacewatch || 628 || align=right | 1.8 km || 
|-id=706 bgcolor=#E9E9E9
| 278706 ||  || — || September 19, 2008 || Kitt Peak || Spacewatch || AGN || align=right | 1.6 km || 
|-id=707 bgcolor=#d6d6d6
| 278707 ||  || — || September 19, 2008 || Kitt Peak || Spacewatch || KOR || align=right | 1.6 km || 
|-id=708 bgcolor=#E9E9E9
| 278708 ||  || — || September 19, 2008 || Kitt Peak || Spacewatch || — || align=right | 2.8 km || 
|-id=709 bgcolor=#E9E9E9
| 278709 ||  || — || September 20, 2008 || Catalina || CSS || EUN || align=right | 1.5 km || 
|-id=710 bgcolor=#E9E9E9
| 278710 ||  || — || September 20, 2008 || Kitt Peak || Spacewatch || — || align=right | 3.3 km || 
|-id=711 bgcolor=#E9E9E9
| 278711 ||  || — || September 20, 2008 || Kitt Peak || Spacewatch || — || align=right | 1.3 km || 
|-id=712 bgcolor=#fefefe
| 278712 ||  || — || September 20, 2008 || Kitt Peak || Spacewatch || — || align=right | 1.1 km || 
|-id=713 bgcolor=#d6d6d6
| 278713 ||  || — || September 20, 2008 || Kitt Peak || Spacewatch || — || align=right | 3.7 km || 
|-id=714 bgcolor=#E9E9E9
| 278714 ||  || — || September 20, 2008 || Kitt Peak || Spacewatch || — || align=right | 1.6 km || 
|-id=715 bgcolor=#E9E9E9
| 278715 ||  || — || September 20, 2008 || Kitt Peak || Spacewatch || — || align=right | 2.7 km || 
|-id=716 bgcolor=#fefefe
| 278716 ||  || — || September 20, 2008 || Kitt Peak || Spacewatch || — || align=right data-sort-value="0.90" | 900 m || 
|-id=717 bgcolor=#d6d6d6
| 278717 ||  || — || September 20, 2008 || Kitt Peak || Spacewatch || CRO || align=right | 2.9 km || 
|-id=718 bgcolor=#E9E9E9
| 278718 ||  || — || September 20, 2008 || Kitt Peak || Spacewatch || — || align=right | 1.4 km || 
|-id=719 bgcolor=#E9E9E9
| 278719 ||  || — || September 20, 2008 || Mount Lemmon || Mount Lemmon Survey || — || align=right | 1.1 km || 
|-id=720 bgcolor=#d6d6d6
| 278720 ||  || — || September 20, 2008 || Mount Lemmon || Mount Lemmon Survey || — || align=right | 3.1 km || 
|-id=721 bgcolor=#d6d6d6
| 278721 ||  || — || September 20, 2008 || Kitt Peak || Spacewatch || — || align=right | 2.9 km || 
|-id=722 bgcolor=#fefefe
| 278722 ||  || — || September 21, 2008 || Kitt Peak || Spacewatch || NYS || align=right data-sort-value="0.81" | 810 m || 
|-id=723 bgcolor=#fefefe
| 278723 ||  || — || September 21, 2008 || Kitt Peak || Spacewatch || — || align=right | 1.1 km || 
|-id=724 bgcolor=#fefefe
| 278724 ||  || — || September 21, 2008 || Kitt Peak || Spacewatch || — || align=right data-sort-value="0.95" | 950 m || 
|-id=725 bgcolor=#E9E9E9
| 278725 ||  || — || September 21, 2008 || Catalina || CSS || — || align=right | 3.5 km || 
|-id=726 bgcolor=#d6d6d6
| 278726 ||  || — || September 21, 2008 || Catalina || CSS || EUP || align=right | 5.3 km || 
|-id=727 bgcolor=#E9E9E9
| 278727 ||  || — || September 21, 2008 || Catalina || CSS || — || align=right | 2.1 km || 
|-id=728 bgcolor=#E9E9E9
| 278728 ||  || — || September 21, 2008 || Catalina || CSS || NEM || align=right | 2.8 km || 
|-id=729 bgcolor=#d6d6d6
| 278729 ||  || — || September 22, 2008 || Kitt Peak || Spacewatch || — || align=right | 2.3 km || 
|-id=730 bgcolor=#E9E9E9
| 278730 ||  || — || September 22, 2008 || Kitt Peak || Spacewatch || WIT || align=right | 1.2 km || 
|-id=731 bgcolor=#d6d6d6
| 278731 ||  || — || September 22, 2008 || Mount Lemmon || Mount Lemmon Survey || CHA || align=right | 2.0 km || 
|-id=732 bgcolor=#d6d6d6
| 278732 ||  || — || September 22, 2008 || Kitt Peak || Spacewatch || — || align=right | 5.1 km || 
|-id=733 bgcolor=#E9E9E9
| 278733 ||  || — || September 22, 2008 || Kitt Peak || Spacewatch || EUN || align=right | 1.6 km || 
|-id=734 bgcolor=#E9E9E9
| 278734 ||  || — || September 23, 2008 || Wrightwood || J. W. Young || — || align=right | 2.1 km || 
|-id=735 bgcolor=#E9E9E9
| 278735 Kamioka ||  ||  || September 27, 2008 || Vallemare di Borbona || V. S. Casulli || — || align=right | 2.8 km || 
|-id=736 bgcolor=#fefefe
| 278736 ||  || — || September 28, 2008 || Wrightwood || J. W. Young || — || align=right | 1.4 km || 
|-id=737 bgcolor=#d6d6d6
| 278737 ||  || — || September 20, 2008 || Kitt Peak || Spacewatch || — || align=right | 3.5 km || 
|-id=738 bgcolor=#E9E9E9
| 278738 ||  || — || September 20, 2008 || Kitt Peak || Spacewatch || — || align=right | 2.1 km || 
|-id=739 bgcolor=#E9E9E9
| 278739 ||  || — || September 21, 2008 || Kitt Peak || Spacewatch || — || align=right | 1.0 km || 
|-id=740 bgcolor=#d6d6d6
| 278740 ||  || — || September 21, 2008 || Kitt Peak || Spacewatch || — || align=right | 2.5 km || 
|-id=741 bgcolor=#E9E9E9
| 278741 ||  || — || September 21, 2008 || Mount Lemmon || Mount Lemmon Survey || AGN || align=right | 1.4 km || 
|-id=742 bgcolor=#E9E9E9
| 278742 ||  || — || September 21, 2008 || Kitt Peak || Spacewatch || — || align=right | 4.3 km || 
|-id=743 bgcolor=#E9E9E9
| 278743 ||  || — || September 21, 2008 || Kitt Peak || Spacewatch || — || align=right | 2.8 km || 
|-id=744 bgcolor=#E9E9E9
| 278744 ||  || — || September 21, 2008 || Kitt Peak || Spacewatch || — || align=right | 2.3 km || 
|-id=745 bgcolor=#E9E9E9
| 278745 ||  || — || September 21, 2008 || Kitt Peak || Spacewatch || — || align=right | 2.9 km || 
|-id=746 bgcolor=#d6d6d6
| 278746 ||  || — || September 21, 2008 || Kitt Peak || Spacewatch || EOS || align=right | 2.5 km || 
|-id=747 bgcolor=#E9E9E9
| 278747 ||  || — || September 21, 2008 || Kitt Peak || Spacewatch || — || align=right | 1.1 km || 
|-id=748 bgcolor=#E9E9E9
| 278748 ||  || — || September 21, 2008 || Kitt Peak || Spacewatch || AGN || align=right | 1.3 km || 
|-id=749 bgcolor=#fefefe
| 278749 ||  || — || September 21, 2008 || Kitt Peak || Spacewatch || — || align=right | 1.1 km || 
|-id=750 bgcolor=#E9E9E9
| 278750 ||  || — || September 21, 2008 || Mount Lemmon || Mount Lemmon Survey || WIT || align=right | 1.3 km || 
|-id=751 bgcolor=#E9E9E9
| 278751 ||  || — || September 21, 2008 || Kitt Peak || Spacewatch || — || align=right | 1.7 km || 
|-id=752 bgcolor=#E9E9E9
| 278752 ||  || — || September 22, 2008 || Kitt Peak || Spacewatch || GEF || align=right | 1.4 km || 
|-id=753 bgcolor=#d6d6d6
| 278753 ||  || — || September 22, 2008 || Mount Lemmon || Mount Lemmon Survey || — || align=right | 3.3 km || 
|-id=754 bgcolor=#E9E9E9
| 278754 ||  || — || September 22, 2008 || Mount Lemmon || Mount Lemmon Survey || — || align=right | 2.1 km || 
|-id=755 bgcolor=#E9E9E9
| 278755 ||  || — || September 22, 2008 || Kitt Peak || Spacewatch || — || align=right | 3.0 km || 
|-id=756 bgcolor=#E9E9E9
| 278756 ||  || — || September 22, 2008 || Mount Lemmon || Mount Lemmon Survey || — || align=right | 1.5 km || 
|-id=757 bgcolor=#d6d6d6
| 278757 ||  || — || September 22, 2008 || Mount Lemmon || Mount Lemmon Survey || — || align=right | 3.2 km || 
|-id=758 bgcolor=#E9E9E9
| 278758 ||  || — || September 22, 2008 || Mount Lemmon || Mount Lemmon Survey || AGN || align=right | 1.3 km || 
|-id=759 bgcolor=#E9E9E9
| 278759 ||  || — || September 22, 2008 || Mount Lemmon || Mount Lemmon Survey || — || align=right | 1.6 km || 
|-id=760 bgcolor=#d6d6d6
| 278760 ||  || — || September 22, 2008 || Mount Lemmon || Mount Lemmon Survey || KAR || align=right | 1.4 km || 
|-id=761 bgcolor=#d6d6d6
| 278761 ||  || — || September 22, 2008 || Kitt Peak || Spacewatch || CHA || align=right | 2.6 km || 
|-id=762 bgcolor=#E9E9E9
| 278762 ||  || — || September 23, 2008 || Kitt Peak || Spacewatch || — || align=right | 3.7 km || 
|-id=763 bgcolor=#d6d6d6
| 278763 ||  || — || September 23, 2008 || Kitt Peak || Spacewatch || — || align=right | 2.9 km || 
|-id=764 bgcolor=#E9E9E9
| 278764 ||  || — || September 23, 2008 || Kitt Peak || Spacewatch || HOF || align=right | 3.0 km || 
|-id=765 bgcolor=#E9E9E9
| 278765 ||  || — || September 24, 2008 || Mount Lemmon || Mount Lemmon Survey || — || align=right | 1.7 km || 
|-id=766 bgcolor=#d6d6d6
| 278766 ||  || — || September 24, 2008 || Mount Lemmon || Mount Lemmon Survey || — || align=right | 3.1 km || 
|-id=767 bgcolor=#d6d6d6
| 278767 ||  || — || September 23, 2008 || Kitt Peak || Spacewatch || EOS || align=right | 2.7 km || 
|-id=768 bgcolor=#E9E9E9
| 278768 ||  || — || September 29, 2008 || Dauban || F. Kugel || — || align=right | 3.1 km || 
|-id=769 bgcolor=#E9E9E9
| 278769 ||  || — || September 22, 2008 || Socorro || LINEAR || — || align=right | 2.8 km || 
|-id=770 bgcolor=#fefefe
| 278770 ||  || — || September 22, 2008 || Socorro || LINEAR || MAS || align=right | 1.0 km || 
|-id=771 bgcolor=#d6d6d6
| 278771 ||  || — || September 23, 2008 || Socorro || LINEAR || KOR || align=right | 2.1 km || 
|-id=772 bgcolor=#d6d6d6
| 278772 ||  || — || September 23, 2008 || Socorro || LINEAR || KOR || align=right | 1.8 km || 
|-id=773 bgcolor=#E9E9E9
| 278773 ||  || — || September 23, 2008 || Socorro || LINEAR || — || align=right | 2.7 km || 
|-id=774 bgcolor=#d6d6d6
| 278774 ||  || — || September 24, 2008 || Socorro || LINEAR || — || align=right | 3.7 km || 
|-id=775 bgcolor=#E9E9E9
| 278775 ||  || — || September 3, 2008 || Kitt Peak || Spacewatch || — || align=right | 1.9 km || 
|-id=776 bgcolor=#E9E9E9
| 278776 ||  || — || September 24, 2008 || Socorro || LINEAR || — || align=right data-sort-value="0.89" | 890 m || 
|-id=777 bgcolor=#E9E9E9
| 278777 ||  || — || September 28, 2008 || Socorro || LINEAR || NEM || align=right | 2.4 km || 
|-id=778 bgcolor=#d6d6d6
| 278778 ||  || — || September 28, 2008 || Socorro || LINEAR || THM || align=right | 3.3 km || 
|-id=779 bgcolor=#E9E9E9
| 278779 ||  || — || September 28, 2008 || Socorro || LINEAR || — || align=right | 1.8 km || 
|-id=780 bgcolor=#d6d6d6
| 278780 ||  || — || September 21, 2008 || Mount Lemmon || Mount Lemmon Survey || — || align=right | 3.9 km || 
|-id=781 bgcolor=#d6d6d6
| 278781 ||  || — || September 23, 2008 || Kitt Peak || Spacewatch || — || align=right | 3.0 km || 
|-id=782 bgcolor=#d6d6d6
| 278782 ||  || — || September 24, 2008 || Mount Lemmon || Mount Lemmon Survey || CHA || align=right | 2.2 km || 
|-id=783 bgcolor=#d6d6d6
| 278783 ||  || — || September 24, 2008 || Kitt Peak || Spacewatch || KOR || align=right | 1.5 km || 
|-id=784 bgcolor=#d6d6d6
| 278784 ||  || — || September 24, 2008 || Mount Lemmon || Mount Lemmon Survey || — || align=right | 5.2 km || 
|-id=785 bgcolor=#d6d6d6
| 278785 ||  || — || September 25, 2008 || Kitt Peak || Spacewatch || — || align=right | 2.9 km || 
|-id=786 bgcolor=#fefefe
| 278786 ||  || — || September 25, 2008 || Kitt Peak || Spacewatch || FLO || align=right data-sort-value="0.78" | 780 m || 
|-id=787 bgcolor=#d6d6d6
| 278787 ||  || — || September 25, 2008 || Mount Lemmon || Mount Lemmon Survey || — || align=right | 2.5 km || 
|-id=788 bgcolor=#E9E9E9
| 278788 ||  || — || September 25, 2008 || Mount Lemmon || Mount Lemmon Survey || — || align=right | 3.6 km || 
|-id=789 bgcolor=#E9E9E9
| 278789 ||  || — || September 25, 2008 || Kitt Peak || Spacewatch || AGN || align=right | 1.3 km || 
|-id=790 bgcolor=#E9E9E9
| 278790 ||  || — || September 25, 2008 || Kitt Peak || Spacewatch || WIT || align=right | 1.1 km || 
|-id=791 bgcolor=#d6d6d6
| 278791 ||  || — || September 25, 2008 || Kitt Peak || Spacewatch || — || align=right | 2.7 km || 
|-id=792 bgcolor=#d6d6d6
| 278792 ||  || — || September 26, 2008 || Kitt Peak || Spacewatch || SYL7:4 || align=right | 4.4 km || 
|-id=793 bgcolor=#E9E9E9
| 278793 ||  || — || September 26, 2008 || Kitt Peak || Spacewatch || KON || align=right | 3.8 km || 
|-id=794 bgcolor=#E9E9E9
| 278794 ||  || — || September 27, 2008 || Catalina || CSS || — || align=right | 1.8 km || 
|-id=795 bgcolor=#E9E9E9
| 278795 ||  || — || September 28, 2008 || Junk Bond || D. Healy || — || align=right | 1.2 km || 
|-id=796 bgcolor=#E9E9E9
| 278796 ||  || — || September 29, 2008 || Hibiscus || N. Teamo || — || align=right | 1.8 km || 
|-id=797 bgcolor=#fefefe
| 278797 ||  || — || September 30, 2008 || La Sagra || OAM Obs. || ERI || align=right | 2.3 km || 
|-id=798 bgcolor=#E9E9E9
| 278798 ||  || — || September 28, 2008 || Mount Lemmon || Mount Lemmon Survey || — || align=right | 1.2 km || 
|-id=799 bgcolor=#E9E9E9
| 278799 ||  || — || September 28, 2008 || Mount Lemmon || Mount Lemmon Survey || PAD || align=right | 2.5 km || 
|-id=800 bgcolor=#E9E9E9
| 278800 ||  || — || September 28, 2008 || Mount Lemmon || Mount Lemmon Survey || — || align=right | 2.3 km || 
|}

278801–278900 

|-bgcolor=#E9E9E9
| 278801 ||  || — || September 28, 2008 || Mount Lemmon || Mount Lemmon Survey || — || align=right | 2.9 km || 
|-id=802 bgcolor=#E9E9E9
| 278802 ||  || — || September 29, 2008 || Kitt Peak || Spacewatch || — || align=right | 2.1 km || 
|-id=803 bgcolor=#d6d6d6
| 278803 ||  || — || December 20, 2004 || Mount Lemmon || Mount Lemmon Survey || — || align=right | 2.6 km || 
|-id=804 bgcolor=#E9E9E9
| 278804 ||  || — || September 29, 2008 || Catalina || CSS || — || align=right | 2.8 km || 
|-id=805 bgcolor=#E9E9E9
| 278805 ||  || — || September 29, 2008 || Kitt Peak || Spacewatch || KON || align=right | 4.2 km || 
|-id=806 bgcolor=#d6d6d6
| 278806 ||  || — || September 24, 2008 || Kitt Peak || Spacewatch || — || align=right | 3.0 km || 
|-id=807 bgcolor=#d6d6d6
| 278807 ||  || — || September 29, 2008 || Goodricke-Pigott || R. A. Tucker || K-2 || align=right | 1.7 km || 
|-id=808 bgcolor=#E9E9E9
| 278808 ||  || — || September 29, 2008 || Catalina || CSS || — || align=right | 1.9 km || 
|-id=809 bgcolor=#E9E9E9
| 278809 ||  || — || September 30, 2008 || La Sagra || OAM Obs. || WIT || align=right | 1.0 km || 
|-id=810 bgcolor=#d6d6d6
| 278810 ||  || — || September 20, 2008 || Kitt Peak || Spacewatch || KAR || align=right | 1.2 km || 
|-id=811 bgcolor=#fefefe
| 278811 ||  || — || September 21, 2008 || Catalina || CSS || ERI || align=right | 1.7 km || 
|-id=812 bgcolor=#d6d6d6
| 278812 ||  || — || September 21, 2008 || Kitt Peak || Spacewatch || — || align=right | 3.3 km || 
|-id=813 bgcolor=#E9E9E9
| 278813 ||  || — || September 22, 2008 || Kitt Peak || Spacewatch || — || align=right | 1.9 km || 
|-id=814 bgcolor=#E9E9E9
| 278814 ||  || — || September 23, 2008 || Mount Lemmon || Mount Lemmon Survey || — || align=right | 3.0 km || 
|-id=815 bgcolor=#d6d6d6
| 278815 ||  || — || September 25, 2008 || Kitt Peak || Spacewatch || — || align=right | 3.2 km || 
|-id=816 bgcolor=#d6d6d6
| 278816 ||  || — || September 25, 2008 || Kitt Peak || Spacewatch || — || align=right | 3.2 km || 
|-id=817 bgcolor=#d6d6d6
| 278817 ||  || — || September 20, 2008 || Kitt Peak || Spacewatch || — || align=right | 2.8 km || 
|-id=818 bgcolor=#E9E9E9
| 278818 ||  || — || September 22, 2008 || Mount Lemmon || Mount Lemmon Survey || MAR || align=right | 1.5 km || 
|-id=819 bgcolor=#E9E9E9
| 278819 ||  || — || September 22, 2008 || Catalina || CSS || — || align=right | 2.2 km || 
|-id=820 bgcolor=#E9E9E9
| 278820 ||  || — || September 23, 2008 || Kitt Peak || Spacewatch || HOF || align=right | 3.4 km || 
|-id=821 bgcolor=#E9E9E9
| 278821 ||  || — || September 24, 2008 || Catalina || CSS || — || align=right | 1.9 km || 
|-id=822 bgcolor=#d6d6d6
| 278822 ||  || — || September 24, 2008 || Kitt Peak || Spacewatch || — || align=right | 2.9 km || 
|-id=823 bgcolor=#E9E9E9
| 278823 ||  || — || September 24, 2008 || Mount Lemmon || Mount Lemmon Survey || — || align=right | 2.5 km || 
|-id=824 bgcolor=#d6d6d6
| 278824 ||  || — || September 24, 2008 || Kitt Peak || Spacewatch || — || align=right | 3.4 km || 
|-id=825 bgcolor=#E9E9E9
| 278825 ||  || — || September 29, 2008 || Catalina || CSS || — || align=right | 3.2 km || 
|-id=826 bgcolor=#E9E9E9
| 278826 ||  || — || September 30, 2008 || Catalina || CSS || — || align=right | 3.5 km || 
|-id=827 bgcolor=#E9E9E9
| 278827 ||  || — || September 22, 2008 || Mount Lemmon || Mount Lemmon Survey || — || align=right | 2.1 km || 
|-id=828 bgcolor=#d6d6d6
| 278828 ||  || — || September 29, 2008 || Catalina || CSS || — || align=right | 5.4 km || 
|-id=829 bgcolor=#d6d6d6
| 278829 ||  || — || September 24, 2008 || Mount Lemmon || Mount Lemmon Survey || — || align=right | 3.6 km || 
|-id=830 bgcolor=#E9E9E9
| 278830 ||  || — || September 29, 2008 || Catalina || CSS || — || align=right | 3.1 km || 
|-id=831 bgcolor=#E9E9E9
| 278831 ||  || — || September 21, 2008 || Kitt Peak || Spacewatch || — || align=right | 1.6 km || 
|-id=832 bgcolor=#d6d6d6
| 278832 ||  || — || September 22, 2008 || Catalina || CSS || — || align=right | 4.9 km || 
|-id=833 bgcolor=#d6d6d6
| 278833 ||  || — || September 23, 2008 || Kitt Peak || Spacewatch || — || align=right | 2.8 km || 
|-id=834 bgcolor=#E9E9E9
| 278834 ||  || — || September 24, 2008 || Mount Lemmon || Mount Lemmon Survey || JUN || align=right | 1.7 km || 
|-id=835 bgcolor=#d6d6d6
| 278835 ||  || — || September 25, 2008 || Kitt Peak || Spacewatch || — || align=right | 3.5 km || 
|-id=836 bgcolor=#E9E9E9
| 278836 ||  || — || September 25, 2008 || Kitt Peak || Spacewatch || — || align=right | 2.4 km || 
|-id=837 bgcolor=#E9E9E9
| 278837 ||  || — || September 27, 2008 || Catalina || CSS || — || align=right | 3.5 km || 
|-id=838 bgcolor=#E9E9E9
| 278838 ||  || — || September 23, 2008 || Socorro || LINEAR || — || align=right | 2.9 km || 
|-id=839 bgcolor=#E9E9E9
| 278839 ||  || — || September 23, 2008 || Socorro || LINEAR || — || align=right | 3.3 km || 
|-id=840 bgcolor=#d6d6d6
| 278840 ||  || — || September 24, 2008 || Socorro || LINEAR || — || align=right | 4.6 km || 
|-id=841 bgcolor=#E9E9E9
| 278841 ||  || — || September 24, 2008 || Mount Lemmon || Mount Lemmon Survey || — || align=right | 2.8 km || 
|-id=842 bgcolor=#E9E9E9
| 278842 ||  || — || September 24, 2008 || Mount Lemmon || Mount Lemmon Survey || — || align=right | 1.9 km || 
|-id=843 bgcolor=#E9E9E9
| 278843 ||  || — || September 28, 2008 || Socorro || LINEAR || — || align=right | 2.8 km || 
|-id=844 bgcolor=#d6d6d6
| 278844 ||  || — || September 29, 2008 || Mount Lemmon || Mount Lemmon Survey || — || align=right | 2.5 km || 
|-id=845 bgcolor=#E9E9E9
| 278845 ||  || — || September 22, 2008 || Socorro || LINEAR || — || align=right | 1.1 km || 
|-id=846 bgcolor=#d6d6d6
| 278846 ||  || — || September 23, 2008 || Socorro || LINEAR || — || align=right | 4.1 km || 
|-id=847 bgcolor=#E9E9E9
| 278847 ||  || — || October 3, 2008 || Cordell-Lorenz || D. T. Durig || WIT || align=right | 1.4 km || 
|-id=848 bgcolor=#d6d6d6
| 278848 ||  || — || October 4, 2008 || Cordell-Lorenz || D. T. Durig || EOS || align=right | 2.1 km || 
|-id=849 bgcolor=#E9E9E9
| 278849 ||  || — || October 2, 2008 || La Sagra || OAM Obs. || — || align=right | 1.6 km || 
|-id=850 bgcolor=#E9E9E9
| 278850 ||  || — || October 4, 2008 || La Sagra || OAM Obs. || AST || align=right | 1.8 km || 
|-id=851 bgcolor=#E9E9E9
| 278851 ||  || — || October 5, 2008 || Hibiscus || N. Teamo || — || align=right | 3.4 km || 
|-id=852 bgcolor=#E9E9E9
| 278852 ||  || — || October 1, 2008 || Catalina || CSS || GEF || align=right | 1.7 km || 
|-id=853 bgcolor=#E9E9E9
| 278853 ||  || — || October 1, 2008 || Mount Lemmon || Mount Lemmon Survey || — || align=right | 2.3 km || 
|-id=854 bgcolor=#d6d6d6
| 278854 ||  || — || October 1, 2008 || Mount Lemmon || Mount Lemmon Survey || — || align=right | 3.5 km || 
|-id=855 bgcolor=#d6d6d6
| 278855 ||  || — || October 1, 2008 || Mount Lemmon || Mount Lemmon Survey || — || align=right | 3.4 km || 
|-id=856 bgcolor=#d6d6d6
| 278856 ||  || — || October 2, 2008 || Kitt Peak || Spacewatch || KAR || align=right | 1.5 km || 
|-id=857 bgcolor=#d6d6d6
| 278857 ||  || — || October 2, 2008 || Mount Lemmon || Mount Lemmon Survey || VER || align=right | 3.3 km || 
|-id=858 bgcolor=#d6d6d6
| 278858 ||  || — || October 1, 2008 || La Sagra || OAM Obs. || — || align=right | 3.0 km || 
|-id=859 bgcolor=#E9E9E9
| 278859 ||  || — || October 1, 2008 || Mount Lemmon || Mount Lemmon Survey || — || align=right data-sort-value="0.92" | 920 m || 
|-id=860 bgcolor=#E9E9E9
| 278860 ||  || — || October 1, 2008 || Catalina || CSS || — || align=right | 2.7 km || 
|-id=861 bgcolor=#d6d6d6
| 278861 ||  || — || October 1, 2008 || Kitt Peak || Spacewatch || KOR || align=right | 1.8 km || 
|-id=862 bgcolor=#E9E9E9
| 278862 ||  || — || October 1, 2008 || Kitt Peak || Spacewatch || — || align=right | 1.2 km || 
|-id=863 bgcolor=#E9E9E9
| 278863 ||  || — || October 1, 2008 || Mount Lemmon || Mount Lemmon Survey || WIT || align=right | 1.2 km || 
|-id=864 bgcolor=#d6d6d6
| 278864 ||  || — || October 1, 2008 || Kitt Peak || Spacewatch || VER || align=right | 3.2 km || 
|-id=865 bgcolor=#d6d6d6
| 278865 ||  || — || October 1, 2008 || Mount Lemmon || Mount Lemmon Survey || — || align=right | 3.4 km || 
|-id=866 bgcolor=#E9E9E9
| 278866 ||  || — || October 2, 2008 || Kitt Peak || Spacewatch || — || align=right | 2.6 km || 
|-id=867 bgcolor=#E9E9E9
| 278867 ||  || — || October 2, 2008 || Kitt Peak || Spacewatch || — || align=right | 1.6 km || 
|-id=868 bgcolor=#d6d6d6
| 278868 ||  || — || October 2, 2008 || Kitt Peak || Spacewatch || — || align=right | 3.9 km || 
|-id=869 bgcolor=#E9E9E9
| 278869 ||  || — || October 2, 2008 || Kitt Peak || Spacewatch || — || align=right | 2.4 km || 
|-id=870 bgcolor=#d6d6d6
| 278870 ||  || — || October 2, 2008 || Kitt Peak || Spacewatch || KOR || align=right | 1.4 km || 
|-id=871 bgcolor=#E9E9E9
| 278871 ||  || — || October 2, 2008 || Kitt Peak || Spacewatch || — || align=right | 2.7 km || 
|-id=872 bgcolor=#d6d6d6
| 278872 ||  || — || October 2, 2008 || Kitt Peak || Spacewatch || EOS || align=right | 2.2 km || 
|-id=873 bgcolor=#d6d6d6
| 278873 ||  || — || October 2, 2008 || Kitt Peak || Spacewatch || KOR || align=right | 1.4 km || 
|-id=874 bgcolor=#E9E9E9
| 278874 ||  || — || October 2, 2008 || Kitt Peak || Spacewatch || — || align=right | 2.0 km || 
|-id=875 bgcolor=#E9E9E9
| 278875 ||  || — || October 2, 2008 || Catalina || CSS || — || align=right | 2.6 km || 
|-id=876 bgcolor=#d6d6d6
| 278876 ||  || — || October 2, 2008 || Kitt Peak || Spacewatch || — || align=right | 2.7 km || 
|-id=877 bgcolor=#d6d6d6
| 278877 ||  || — || October 2, 2008 || Kitt Peak || Spacewatch || — || align=right | 3.3 km || 
|-id=878 bgcolor=#d6d6d6
| 278878 ||  || — || October 2, 2008 || Kitt Peak || Spacewatch || HYG || align=right | 4.2 km || 
|-id=879 bgcolor=#E9E9E9
| 278879 ||  || — || October 2, 2008 || Kitt Peak || Spacewatch || — || align=right | 2.3 km || 
|-id=880 bgcolor=#E9E9E9
| 278880 ||  || — || October 2, 2008 || Kitt Peak || Spacewatch || HEN || align=right | 1.6 km || 
|-id=881 bgcolor=#d6d6d6
| 278881 ||  || — || September 3, 2008 || Kitt Peak || Spacewatch || EOS || align=right | 2.2 km || 
|-id=882 bgcolor=#fefefe
| 278882 ||  || — || October 2, 2008 || Mount Lemmon || Mount Lemmon Survey || — || align=right data-sort-value="0.84" | 840 m || 
|-id=883 bgcolor=#fefefe
| 278883 ||  || — || October 2, 2008 || Mount Lemmon || Mount Lemmon Survey || — || align=right data-sort-value="0.92" | 920 m || 
|-id=884 bgcolor=#E9E9E9
| 278884 ||  || — || October 2, 2008 || Mount Lemmon || Mount Lemmon Survey || DOR || align=right | 2.9 km || 
|-id=885 bgcolor=#E9E9E9
| 278885 ||  || — || October 2, 2008 || La Sagra || OAM Obs. || — || align=right | 1.6 km || 
|-id=886 bgcolor=#d6d6d6
| 278886 ||  || — || October 3, 2008 || Kitt Peak || Spacewatch || — || align=right | 2.8 km || 
|-id=887 bgcolor=#E9E9E9
| 278887 ||  || — || October 3, 2008 || Mount Lemmon || Mount Lemmon Survey || EUN || align=right | 1.6 km || 
|-id=888 bgcolor=#E9E9E9
| 278888 ||  || — || October 3, 2008 || Kitt Peak || Spacewatch || — || align=right | 2.6 km || 
|-id=889 bgcolor=#E9E9E9
| 278889 ||  || — || October 3, 2008 || Kitt Peak || Spacewatch || MIS || align=right | 3.9 km || 
|-id=890 bgcolor=#d6d6d6
| 278890 ||  || — || October 3, 2008 || Kitt Peak || Spacewatch || — || align=right | 3.4 km || 
|-id=891 bgcolor=#d6d6d6
| 278891 ||  || — || January 31, 2006 || Kitt Peak || Spacewatch || — || align=right | 3.1 km || 
|-id=892 bgcolor=#E9E9E9
| 278892 ||  || — || October 6, 2008 || Kitt Peak || Spacewatch || PAD || align=right | 1.5 km || 
|-id=893 bgcolor=#d6d6d6
| 278893 ||  || — || October 6, 2008 || Kitt Peak || Spacewatch || — || align=right | 3.4 km || 
|-id=894 bgcolor=#d6d6d6
| 278894 ||  || — || October 6, 2008 || Mount Lemmon || Mount Lemmon Survey || — || align=right | 2.8 km || 
|-id=895 bgcolor=#d6d6d6
| 278895 ||  || — || October 6, 2008 || Mount Lemmon || Mount Lemmon Survey || HYG || align=right | 3.1 km || 
|-id=896 bgcolor=#E9E9E9
| 278896 ||  || — || October 6, 2008 || Mount Lemmon || Mount Lemmon Survey || — || align=right | 1.7 km || 
|-id=897 bgcolor=#E9E9E9
| 278897 ||  || — || October 6, 2008 || Mount Lemmon || Mount Lemmon Survey || — || align=right | 1.5 km || 
|-id=898 bgcolor=#d6d6d6
| 278898 ||  || — || October 6, 2008 || Catalina || CSS || — || align=right | 4.3 km || 
|-id=899 bgcolor=#E9E9E9
| 278899 ||  || — || October 6, 2008 || Kitt Peak || Spacewatch || — || align=right data-sort-value="0.92" | 920 m || 
|-id=900 bgcolor=#d6d6d6
| 278900 ||  || — || October 6, 2008 || Kitt Peak || Spacewatch || — || align=right | 2.9 km || 
|}

278901–279000 

|-bgcolor=#d6d6d6
| 278901 ||  || — || October 6, 2008 || Catalina || CSS || EOS || align=right | 2.2 km || 
|-id=902 bgcolor=#E9E9E9
| 278902 ||  || — || October 7, 2008 || Kitt Peak || Spacewatch || — || align=right | 1.6 km || 
|-id=903 bgcolor=#d6d6d6
| 278903 ||  || — || October 8, 2008 || Mount Lemmon || Mount Lemmon Survey || — || align=right | 3.1 km || 
|-id=904 bgcolor=#d6d6d6
| 278904 ||  || — || October 8, 2008 || Mount Lemmon || Mount Lemmon Survey || HYG || align=right | 2.7 km || 
|-id=905 bgcolor=#E9E9E9
| 278905 ||  || — || October 8, 2008 || Mount Lemmon || Mount Lemmon Survey || HOF || align=right | 2.7 km || 
|-id=906 bgcolor=#E9E9E9
| 278906 ||  || — || October 9, 2008 || Mount Lemmon || Mount Lemmon Survey || AST || align=right | 1.8 km || 
|-id=907 bgcolor=#E9E9E9
| 278907 ||  || — || October 9, 2008 || Mount Lemmon || Mount Lemmon Survey || — || align=right | 2.4 km || 
|-id=908 bgcolor=#E9E9E9
| 278908 ||  || — || October 9, 2008 || Mount Lemmon || Mount Lemmon Survey || WIT || align=right data-sort-value="0.92" | 920 m || 
|-id=909 bgcolor=#d6d6d6
| 278909 ||  || — || October 9, 2008 || Mount Lemmon || Mount Lemmon Survey || KOR || align=right | 1.3 km || 
|-id=910 bgcolor=#d6d6d6
| 278910 ||  || — || October 9, 2008 || Mount Lemmon || Mount Lemmon Survey || — || align=right | 2.8 km || 
|-id=911 bgcolor=#E9E9E9
| 278911 ||  || — || October 9, 2008 || Mount Lemmon || Mount Lemmon Survey || — || align=right | 2.2 km || 
|-id=912 bgcolor=#d6d6d6
| 278912 ||  || — || October 9, 2008 || Mount Lemmon || Mount Lemmon Survey || KOR || align=right | 1.8 km || 
|-id=913 bgcolor=#E9E9E9
| 278913 ||  || — || October 9, 2008 || Mount Lemmon || Mount Lemmon Survey || PAD || align=right | 1.7 km || 
|-id=914 bgcolor=#E9E9E9
| 278914 ||  || — || October 9, 2008 || Kitt Peak || Spacewatch || — || align=right | 1.6 km || 
|-id=915 bgcolor=#E9E9E9
| 278915 ||  || — || October 4, 2008 || Catalina || CSS || ADE || align=right | 2.4 km || 
|-id=916 bgcolor=#fefefe
| 278916 ||  || — || October 4, 2008 || Catalina || CSS || SVE || align=right | 1.9 km || 
|-id=917 bgcolor=#d6d6d6
| 278917 ||  || — || October 1, 2008 || Catalina || CSS || — || align=right | 3.8 km || 
|-id=918 bgcolor=#E9E9E9
| 278918 ||  || — || October 1, 2008 || Catalina || CSS || — || align=right | 3.8 km || 
|-id=919 bgcolor=#E9E9E9
| 278919 ||  || — || October 1, 2008 || Catalina || CSS || HNS || align=right | 1.9 km || 
|-id=920 bgcolor=#E9E9E9
| 278920 ||  || — || October 6, 2008 || Mount Lemmon || Mount Lemmon Survey || PAD || align=right | 2.8 km || 
|-id=921 bgcolor=#d6d6d6
| 278921 ||  || — || October 2, 2008 || Mount Lemmon || Mount Lemmon Survey || — || align=right | 3.1 km || 
|-id=922 bgcolor=#E9E9E9
| 278922 ||  || — || October 1, 2008 || Catalina || CSS || INO || align=right | 1.6 km || 
|-id=923 bgcolor=#d6d6d6
| 278923 ||  || — || October 1, 2008 || Mount Lemmon || Mount Lemmon Survey || 7:4 || align=right | 3.8 km || 
|-id=924 bgcolor=#E9E9E9
| 278924 ||  || — || October 3, 2008 || Socorro || LINEAR || KON || align=right | 3.9 km || 
|-id=925 bgcolor=#d6d6d6
| 278925 ||  || — || October 6, 2008 || Mount Lemmon || Mount Lemmon Survey || — || align=right | 4.5 km || 
|-id=926 bgcolor=#E9E9E9
| 278926 ||  || — || October 6, 2008 || Mount Lemmon || Mount Lemmon Survey || — || align=right | 2.6 km || 
|-id=927 bgcolor=#d6d6d6
| 278927 ||  || — || October 21, 2008 || Needville || J. Dellinger, M. Eastman || — || align=right | 4.5 km || 
|-id=928 bgcolor=#fefefe
| 278928 ||  || — || October 25, 2008 || Sierra Stars || F. Tozzi || — || align=right | 1.6 km || 
|-id=929 bgcolor=#E9E9E9
| 278929 ||  || — || October 27, 2008 || Catalina || CSS || — || align=right | 4.5 km || 
|-id=930 bgcolor=#d6d6d6
| 278930 ||  || — || October 26, 2008 || Bisei SG Center || BATTeRS || — || align=right | 4.5 km || 
|-id=931 bgcolor=#d6d6d6
| 278931 ||  || — || October 17, 2008 || Kitt Peak || Spacewatch || — || align=right | 3.5 km || 
|-id=932 bgcolor=#d6d6d6
| 278932 ||  || — || October 17, 2008 || Kitt Peak || Spacewatch || KOR || align=right | 1.5 km || 
|-id=933 bgcolor=#E9E9E9
| 278933 ||  || — || October 17, 2008 || Kitt Peak || Spacewatch || — || align=right | 1.4 km || 
|-id=934 bgcolor=#E9E9E9
| 278934 ||  || — || October 17, 2008 || Kitt Peak || Spacewatch || — || align=right | 5.0 km || 
|-id=935 bgcolor=#d6d6d6
| 278935 ||  || — || October 19, 2008 || Kitt Peak || Spacewatch || — || align=right | 2.8 km || 
|-id=936 bgcolor=#d6d6d6
| 278936 ||  || — || October 19, 2008 || Kitt Peak || Spacewatch || — || align=right | 3.1 km || 
|-id=937 bgcolor=#E9E9E9
| 278937 ||  || — || October 20, 2008 || Mount Lemmon || Mount Lemmon Survey || — || align=right | 1.0 km || 
|-id=938 bgcolor=#d6d6d6
| 278938 ||  || — || October 20, 2008 || Kitt Peak || Spacewatch || — || align=right | 4.6 km || 
|-id=939 bgcolor=#d6d6d6
| 278939 ||  || — || October 20, 2008 || Kitt Peak || Spacewatch || — || align=right | 3.4 km || 
|-id=940 bgcolor=#d6d6d6
| 278940 ||  || — || October 20, 2008 || Kitt Peak || Spacewatch || — || align=right | 3.0 km || 
|-id=941 bgcolor=#d6d6d6
| 278941 ||  || — || October 20, 2008 || Kitt Peak || Spacewatch || URS || align=right | 4.7 km || 
|-id=942 bgcolor=#E9E9E9
| 278942 ||  || — || October 20, 2008 || Mount Lemmon || Mount Lemmon Survey || PAD || align=right | 1.7 km || 
|-id=943 bgcolor=#d6d6d6
| 278943 ||  || — || October 20, 2008 || Mount Lemmon || Mount Lemmon Survey || EOS || align=right | 4.7 km || 
|-id=944 bgcolor=#d6d6d6
| 278944 ||  || — || October 20, 2008 || Kitt Peak || Spacewatch || — || align=right | 3.7 km || 
|-id=945 bgcolor=#E9E9E9
| 278945 ||  || — || October 21, 2008 || Kitt Peak || Spacewatch || — || align=right | 1.9 km || 
|-id=946 bgcolor=#E9E9E9
| 278946 ||  || — || October 21, 2008 || Kitt Peak || Spacewatch || — || align=right | 1.4 km || 
|-id=947 bgcolor=#d6d6d6
| 278947 ||  || — || October 21, 2008 || Kitt Peak || Spacewatch || CHA || align=right | 2.3 km || 
|-id=948 bgcolor=#d6d6d6
| 278948 ||  || — || October 21, 2008 || Kitt Peak || Spacewatch || — || align=right | 4.8 km || 
|-id=949 bgcolor=#d6d6d6
| 278949 ||  || — || October 21, 2008 || Kitt Peak || Spacewatch || EOS || align=right | 2.6 km || 
|-id=950 bgcolor=#E9E9E9
| 278950 ||  || — || October 21, 2008 || Mount Lemmon || Mount Lemmon Survey || WIT || align=right | 1.0 km || 
|-id=951 bgcolor=#d6d6d6
| 278951 ||  || — || October 21, 2008 || Kitt Peak || Spacewatch || EOS || align=right | 3.1 km || 
|-id=952 bgcolor=#d6d6d6
| 278952 ||  || — || October 21, 2008 || Kitt Peak || Spacewatch || — || align=right | 4.0 km || 
|-id=953 bgcolor=#d6d6d6
| 278953 ||  || — || October 21, 2008 || Mount Lemmon || Mount Lemmon Survey || — || align=right | 4.4 km || 
|-id=954 bgcolor=#d6d6d6
| 278954 ||  || — || October 21, 2008 || Kitt Peak || Spacewatch || CRO || align=right | 4.8 km || 
|-id=955 bgcolor=#d6d6d6
| 278955 ||  || — || October 21, 2008 || Kitt Peak || Spacewatch || — || align=right | 3.9 km || 
|-id=956 bgcolor=#d6d6d6
| 278956 Shei-Pa ||  ||  || October 22, 2008 || Lulin || X. Y. Hsiao, Q.-z. Ye || ALA || align=right | 3.8 km || 
|-id=957 bgcolor=#E9E9E9
| 278957 ||  || — || October 23, 2008 || Kitt Peak || Spacewatch || MIT || align=right | 4.1 km || 
|-id=958 bgcolor=#E9E9E9
| 278958 ||  || — || October 25, 2008 || Kitt Peak || Spacewatch || — || align=right | 1.8 km || 
|-id=959 bgcolor=#E9E9E9
| 278959 ||  || — || October 23, 2008 || Socorro || LINEAR || — || align=right | 3.5 km || 
|-id=960 bgcolor=#E9E9E9
| 278960 ||  || — || October 25, 2008 || Socorro || LINEAR || JUN || align=right | 1.2 km || 
|-id=961 bgcolor=#E9E9E9
| 278961 ||  || — || October 26, 2008 || Socorro || LINEAR || — || align=right | 3.7 km || 
|-id=962 bgcolor=#E9E9E9
| 278962 ||  || — || October 24, 2008 || Socorro || LINEAR || — || align=right | 3.1 km || 
|-id=963 bgcolor=#E9E9E9
| 278963 ||  || — || October 25, 2008 || Socorro || LINEAR || — || align=right | 2.4 km || 
|-id=964 bgcolor=#E9E9E9
| 278964 ||  || — || October 27, 2008 || Socorro || LINEAR || — || align=right | 1.4 km || 
|-id=965 bgcolor=#d6d6d6
| 278965 ||  || — || October 20, 2008 || Kitt Peak || Spacewatch || — || align=right | 3.2 km || 
|-id=966 bgcolor=#E9E9E9
| 278966 ||  || — || October 21, 2008 || Kitt Peak || Spacewatch || — || align=right | 2.4 km || 
|-id=967 bgcolor=#d6d6d6
| 278967 ||  || — || October 22, 2008 || Kitt Peak || Spacewatch || — || align=right | 2.8 km || 
|-id=968 bgcolor=#d6d6d6
| 278968 ||  || — || October 22, 2008 || Kitt Peak || Spacewatch || — || align=right | 3.7 km || 
|-id=969 bgcolor=#E9E9E9
| 278969 ||  || — || October 23, 2008 || Kitt Peak || Spacewatch || — || align=right | 1.1 km || 
|-id=970 bgcolor=#E9E9E9
| 278970 ||  || — || October 23, 2008 || Kitt Peak || Spacewatch || AGN || align=right | 1.7 km || 
|-id=971 bgcolor=#fefefe
| 278971 ||  || — || October 23, 2008 || Kitt Peak || Spacewatch || — || align=right | 1.9 km || 
|-id=972 bgcolor=#d6d6d6
| 278972 ||  || — || October 23, 2008 || Mount Lemmon || Mount Lemmon Survey || — || align=right | 4.3 km || 
|-id=973 bgcolor=#d6d6d6
| 278973 ||  || — || October 23, 2008 || Kitt Peak || Spacewatch || — || align=right | 4.0 km || 
|-id=974 bgcolor=#E9E9E9
| 278974 ||  || — || October 23, 2008 || Kitt Peak || Spacewatch || — || align=right | 2.4 km || 
|-id=975 bgcolor=#E9E9E9
| 278975 ||  || — || October 24, 2008 || Kitt Peak || Spacewatch || NEM || align=right | 3.1 km || 
|-id=976 bgcolor=#d6d6d6
| 278976 ||  || — || October 24, 2008 || Kitt Peak || Spacewatch || — || align=right | 3.6 km || 
|-id=977 bgcolor=#E9E9E9
| 278977 ||  || — || October 24, 2008 || Kitt Peak || Spacewatch || — || align=right | 3.2 km || 
|-id=978 bgcolor=#d6d6d6
| 278978 ||  || — || October 24, 2008 || Catalina || CSS || — || align=right | 3.3 km || 
|-id=979 bgcolor=#d6d6d6
| 278979 ||  || — || October 24, 2008 || Kitt Peak || Spacewatch || THM || align=right | 5.2 km || 
|-id=980 bgcolor=#d6d6d6
| 278980 ||  || — || October 24, 2008 || Mount Lemmon || Mount Lemmon Survey || — || align=right | 3.1 km || 
|-id=981 bgcolor=#d6d6d6
| 278981 ||  || — || October 24, 2008 || Mount Lemmon || Mount Lemmon Survey || — || align=right | 2.9 km || 
|-id=982 bgcolor=#d6d6d6
| 278982 ||  || — || October 24, 2008 || Mount Lemmon || Mount Lemmon Survey || — || align=right | 3.4 km || 
|-id=983 bgcolor=#E9E9E9
| 278983 ||  || — || October 25, 2008 || Catalina || CSS || — || align=right | 4.2 km || 
|-id=984 bgcolor=#d6d6d6
| 278984 ||  || — || October 25, 2008 || Mount Lemmon || Mount Lemmon Survey || — || align=right | 3.9 km || 
|-id=985 bgcolor=#d6d6d6
| 278985 ||  || — || October 26, 2008 || Mount Lemmon || Mount Lemmon Survey || — || align=right | 4.1 km || 
|-id=986 bgcolor=#d6d6d6
| 278986 Chenshuchu ||  ||  || October 20, 2008 || Lulin Observatory || X. Y. Hsiao, Q.-z. Ye || KOR || align=right | 2.1 km || 
|-id=987 bgcolor=#E9E9E9
| 278987 ||  || — || October 27, 2008 || Skylive Obs. || F. Tozzi || — || align=right | 2.1 km || 
|-id=988 bgcolor=#E9E9E9
| 278988 ||  || — || October 23, 2008 || Kitt Peak || Spacewatch || — || align=right | 2.4 km || 
|-id=989 bgcolor=#d6d6d6
| 278989 ||  || — || October 23, 2008 || Kitt Peak || Spacewatch || KOR || align=right | 1.4 km || 
|-id=990 bgcolor=#d6d6d6
| 278990 ||  || — || October 23, 2008 || Mount Lemmon || Mount Lemmon Survey || EOS || align=right | 2.8 km || 
|-id=991 bgcolor=#d6d6d6
| 278991 ||  || — || October 24, 2008 || Catalina || CSS || — || align=right | 3.3 km || 
|-id=992 bgcolor=#d6d6d6
| 278992 ||  || — || October 24, 2008 || Catalina || CSS || BRA || align=right | 2.1 km || 
|-id=993 bgcolor=#E9E9E9
| 278993 ||  || — || October 24, 2008 || Catalina || CSS || KRM || align=right | 3.3 km || 
|-id=994 bgcolor=#E9E9E9
| 278994 ||  || — || October 25, 2008 || Kitt Peak || Spacewatch || JUN || align=right | 1.6 km || 
|-id=995 bgcolor=#E9E9E9
| 278995 ||  || — || October 25, 2008 || Catalina || CSS || WIT || align=right | 1.4 km || 
|-id=996 bgcolor=#E9E9E9
| 278996 ||  || — || October 25, 2008 || Catalina || CSS || — || align=right | 2.9 km || 
|-id=997 bgcolor=#d6d6d6
| 278997 ||  || — || October 25, 2008 || Kitt Peak || Spacewatch || VER || align=right | 4.5 km || 
|-id=998 bgcolor=#fefefe
| 278998 ||  || — || October 25, 2008 || Mount Lemmon || Mount Lemmon Survey || — || align=right | 2.3 km || 
|-id=999 bgcolor=#E9E9E9
| 278999 ||  || — || October 26, 2008 || Mount Lemmon || Mount Lemmon Survey || — || align=right | 1.2 km || 
|-id=000 bgcolor=#E9E9E9
| 279000 ||  || — || October 26, 2008 || Kitt Peak || Spacewatch || — || align=right | 1.5 km || 
|}

References

External links 
 Discovery Circumstances: Numbered Minor Planets (275001)–(280000) (IAU Minor Planet Center)

0278